= Reagan (given name) =

Reagan is a unisex given name, a transferred use of the Irish surnames Regan and Reagan, which are Anglicized forms of Ó Riagáin, meaning ‘’descendant of Riagáin’’, a name of uncertain meaning.

== Men ==
- Reagan Aliklik, Nauruan politician
- Reagan V. Brown (1921–1999), American politician and commissioner
- Reagan Campbell-Gillard (born 1993), Australian professional rugby league footballer
- Reagan Dunk (born 1994), American soccer player
- Reagan Dunn (born 1971), American politician
- Reagan Jones (born 1973), American singer-songwriter
- Reagan Singh Keisham (born 1991), Indian professional footballer
- Reagan Louie (born 1951), American photographer, academic, and artist
- Reagan Maui'a (born 1984), American-Samoan professional football player
- Reagan Mpande (born 2000), Ugandan professional footballer
- Reagan Noble (born 1983), South African footballer
- Reagan Ogle (born 1999), Australian professional soccer player
- Reagan O'Neal (1948–2007), American author
- Reagan Turman (1933–2007), American professional boxer
- Reagan Wickens (born 1994), Australian swimmer
- Reagan Wynn, American attorney

== Women ==
- Reagan Charleston (born 1988), American jewelry designer, lawyer and reality television personality
- Reagan Conrad, American podcaster, producer and writer
- Reagan Gomez-Preston (born 1980), American actress
- Reagan Dale Neis (born 1976), Canadian actress
- Reagan Pasternak (born 1977), Canadian actress
- Reagan Paul, American politician
- Reagan Rust (born 1997), American ice hockey player
- Reagan Simmons-Hancock (1998–2020), American murder victim
- Reagan Strange (born 2004), American singer and actress
- Reagan Tokes (1995–2017), American murder victim
- Reagan Wilson (1947–2026), American model

== Fictional characters ==
- Reagan Lucas, a character in the television sitcom New Girl
- Dr. Reagan Ridley, a character in the Netflix animated sitcom Inside Job

== See also ==
- Rheagan Courville (born 1993), American collegiate gymnast
- Rheagan Wallace (born 1987), American actress
- Reagan (surname)
- Reagan (disambiguation)
- Reigan Derry (born 1988), Australian singer and songwriter
- Reigan Heskey (born 2008), English professional footballer
- Raegan (given name)
- Raygan Kirk (born 2001), Canadian ice hockey player
- Regan (given name)
- Regan (surname)
- Regan (disambiguation)
- Ragan (surname)
- Ragan (disambiguation)
