= Regan =

- Language: Irish

Origin
- Meaning: From ri "sovereign, king" and the diminutive -in; hence "the king's child"
- Region of origin: Ireland

Other names
- Variant forms: Riagán, Ríogáin, Ó Riagáin, Ó Ríogáin, O Regan, O'Reagan, O'Regan, Ragon, Riggin, Riggins

The family name Regan, along with its cognates O'Regan, O Regan, Reagan, and Ragon,O'Reagan, is an Anglicized form of the Irish surname Ó Riagáin or Ó Ríogáin, from Ua Riagáin. The meaning is likely to have originated in ancient Gaelic ri "sovereign, king" and the diminutive suffix -in; thus "the king's child" or "big king". The name was borne by two distinct families: one seated in Meath, the other in Thomond.

The O'Regans of Meath were a branch of the southern Ui Neill and one of the four Tribes of Tara. Before the Anglo-Norman invasion, they were lords of south Breagh and the north of present-day County Dublin. They took a leading part in the wars against the Danes. In the year 1029, Mathghamhain Ó Riagáin, king of Breagh, captured the king of Dublin, Amhlaoibh son of Sitric, releasing him only upon payment of an enormous ransom, which included the celebrated Sword of Carlus. The O'Regans were dispossessed soon after the invasion and dispersed through Ireland.

The O'Regans of Thomond are a Dalcassian family said to be descended from Riagán, son of Donncuan, a brother of Brian Boru.

The unisex forename Regan is likely to have derived sometime later from the Latin Regina "queen", the feminine form of Rex (stem reg-) "king", which is also the source of the name Reginald.

== Persons with the surname ==
- Ash Regan (born 1974), Scottish politician
- Bill Regan (disambiguation), several people
- Bob Regan (born 1947), American country music songwriter
- Brian Regan (disambiguation), several people
- Bridget Regan (born 1982), American actress
- Charles Tate Regan (1878–1943), British ichthyologist
- Charlotte Regan, British director of 2023 film Scrapper
- Daithí Regan (born 1968), Irish hurler
- David M. Regan (born 1935), Canadian psychologist
- Donald Regan (1918–2003), U.S. Treasury Secretary and Chief of Staff to President Ronald Reagan
- Edward Regan (1930–2014), American politician and government bureaucrat
- Erin Regan (born 1980), retired American soccer player
- Eugene Regan (born 1952), Irish barrister and politician
- Fionn Regan (born 1981), Irish folk musician
- Frank S. Regan (1862–1944), American politician and businessman
- Geoff Regan (born 1959), Canadian politician and federal cabinet minister, son of Gerald Regan
- Gerald Regan (1928–2019), 19th premier of Nova Scotia, father of Geoff, Laura and Nancy Regan
- Jack Regan (1912–1988), Australian rules footballer
- James Regan (disambiguation), several people
- Jayne Regan (1909–2000), American actress
- Jessica Regan (born 1982), Irish actress
- Joan Regan (1928–2013), English singer
- John Regan (disambiguation), several people
- Judith Regan (born 1953), book publisher
- Julianne Regan (born 1962), English singer, songwriter and musician, lead singer of the band All About Eve
- Kelly Regan (born 1961), Canadian politician, wife of Geoff Regan
- Kenneth M. Regan (1891–1959), American politician
- Larry Regan (1930–2009), Canadian National Hockey League player, coach, manager and executive
- Laura Regan (born 1977), Canadian actress, daughter of Gerald Regan
- Linda Regan (born 1949), English actress who appeared in the British TV show Hi-de-Hi!
- Mark Regan (born 1972), English rugby union player
- Mike Regan (disambiguation), several people
- Nancy Regan (born 1966), Canadian news anchor, journalist and TV personality, daughter of Gerald Regan
- Natasha Regan (born 1971), English chess player
- Patrick Regan (disambiguation), several people
- Phil Regan (actor) (1906–1996)
- Phil Regan (baseball) (born 1937), American Major League Baseball pitcher
- Robert P. Regan (1936–1995), American businessman and politician
- Seamus O'Regan (born 1971), Canadian politician and former television personality
- Terry Regan (born 1958), Australian former rugby league footballer
- Tim O'Regan, American musician
- Tom Regan (1938–2017), American philosopher, animal rights activist and academic
- Tony Óg Regan (born 1983), Irish hurler
- Trish Regan (born 1972), American broadcast journalist and author
- Vincent Regan (born 1965), British actor

== Fictional characters ==
- Regan (King Lear), the middle daughter of the Shakespearean tragedy's protagonist
- Jack Regan, protagonist of the British television police drama The Sweeney
- Rory Regan, real name of Ragman, a DC Comics superhero
- Rusty Regan, a never-seen character in the Raymond Chandler novel The Big Sleep

== See also ==
- Reagan (disambiguation)
