= Raegan (given name) =

Raegan is a given name. Notable people with the name include:

- Raegan Albarnas (born 1989), Indian professional association football player
- Raegan Beers (born 2004), American college basketball player
- Raegan Butcher, American poet and actor
- Raegan Higgins, American mathematician
- Raegan LaRochelle, American politician
- Raegan Oranje (born 1996), South African rugby union player
- Raegan Pebley (born 1975), American basketball executive
- Raegan Revord (born 2008), American actor and novelist
- Raegan Rutty (born 2002), Caymanian beauty pageant titleholder

== See also ==
- Raygan Kirk
- Reagan (disambiguation)
- Reigan
- Regan (disambiguation)
- Ragan (disambiguation)
