= Tamihere =

Tamihere is a surname. Notable people with the surname include:

- David Tamihere (born 1953), New Zealand convicted criminal and murderer
- Don Tamihere (born 1972), New Zealand Anglican bishop
- John Tamihere (born 1959), New Zealand politician and brother of David Tamihere
- Regan Tamihere (born 1984), New Zealand former professional rugby union player and nephew of David and John Tamihere
