= Regan (given name) =

Unisex given name

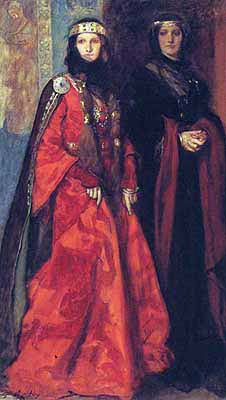
- Goneril and Regan from King Lear by Edwin Austin Abbey.
- Pronunciation: English: /rɛɡən/; English: /riːɡən/
- Gender: Unisex
- Language: Irish

Origin
- Meaning: descendant of Riagán

Other names
- Related names: Reagan

Regan is a unisex given name with multiple origins. It is a transferred use of the Irish surnames Regan and Reagan, which are Anglicized forms of Ó Riagáin, meaning 'descendant of Riagán', a name of uncertain meaning. Use for girls was influenced by a character in William Shakespeare’s tragic play King Lear. Regan was more commonly used for males in the Anglosphere in the 1800s. It came into occasional use for girls in the United States in the late 1940s. Usage of the name for American girls doubled after it was used for a character in the 1973 American supernatural horror film The Exorcist. The name was ranked among the top 1,000 names for American girls for the first time in 1974. Along with Reagan, the name dropped in popularity during the presidency of United States president Ronald Reagan in the 1980s, when it was out of fashion to name children after presidents. The names Regan and Reagan, along with phonetic spelling variants such as Raegan and Raygan, all increased in use during the 1990s and remain in regular use for both boys and girls. In some instances, the name might have been seen as a less popular alternative to the name Megan.

== Men ==
- Regan Booty (born 1998), English professional footballer
- Regan Buckley (born 1997), Irish professional boxer
- Regan Burns (born 1968), American actor, comedian, and game show host
- Regan Cameron, New Zealand photographer
- Regan Charles-Cook (born 1997), English professional footballer
- Regan Farquhar (born 1978), American rapper and producer
- Regan Gascoigne (born 1996), English professional dancer, singer and actor
- Regan Gentry (born 1976), New Zealand artist and sculptor
- Regan Gough (born 1996), New Zealand professional track cyclist and road cyclist
- Regan Grace (born 1996), Welsh professional dual-code rugby footballer
- Regan Griffiths (born 2000), English professional footballer
- Regan Grimes (born 1993), Canadian bodybuilder
- Regan Gurung (born 1969), American psychologist and author
- Regan Hagar, American musician
- Regan Harrison (born 1977), Australian former breaststroke swimmer and Olympian
- Regan Hendry (born 1998), Scottish professional footballer
- Regan Kelly (born 1981), Canadian former professional ice hockey player
- Regan King (born 1980), New Zealand rugby union player
- Regan Linney (born 1997), English professional footballer
- Regan Mizrahi (born 2000), American former child actor
- Regan Poole (born 1998), Welsh footballer
- Regan Riley (born 2002), English professional footballer
- Regan Ryzuk (born 1955), American composer and pianist
- Regan Slater (born 1999), English professional footballer
- Regan Lee Smith (born 1983), American former professional stock car racing driver and a current pit reporter for Fox NASCAR
- Regan Tamanui, Australian artist
- Regan Tamihere (born 1984), New Zealand former professional rugby union player
- Regan Truesdale (born 1963), American basketball player
- Regan Upshaw (born 1975), American former professional football player
- Regan Verney (born 1992), New Zealand rugby union player
- Regan Walker (born 1996), English former footballer
- Regan Ware (born 1994), New Zealand professional rugby union player
- Regan West (born 1979), New Zealand-born Irish international cricketer
- Regan Wolfrom, Canadian politician
- Regan Young, American actor

== Women ==
- Regan Bailey, American nutritional epidemiologist
- Regan Deering, American politician
- Regan Hastings (born 1951), American writer and novelist
- Regan Lamble (born 1991), Australian athlete and Olympian
- Regan Lauscher (born 1980), Canadian luger and Olympian
- Regan Mandryk, Canadian academic
- Regan Rathwell (born 2004), Canadian competitive swimmer and Olympian
- Regan Rodriguez, American actress
- Regan Russell (1955–2020), Canadian animal rights activist
- Regan Hood Scott (born 1983), American volleyball player
- Regan Smith (born 2002), American competitive swimmer and Olympian
- Regan Steigleder (born 1998), American professional soccer player
- Regan Yee (born 1995), Canadian track and field athlete and Olympian

== Fictional characters ==
- Regan, a daughter of King Lear in Shakespeare's play King Lear
- Regan Abbott, character in the movie A Quiet Place
- Regan Hamleigh, character in The Pillars of the Earth novel and miniseries
- Regan MacNeil, the central character of the novel The Exorcist
- Regan O'Neill, the narrator and viewpoint character of the novel Luna by Julie Anne Peters
- Regan Wyngarde, also known as Lady Mastermind, a Marvel Comics villain
