= Ragano =

Ragano is a surname. Notable people with the surname include:

- Frank Ragano (1923–1998), American lawyer
- Maurizio Ragano (died 1640), Roman Catholic prelate

== See also ==
- Ragan (surname)
