= Reagan National (disambiguation) =

Reagan National may refer to:

- Ronald Reagan Washington National Airport, Virginia, USA; serving the metropolitan region of Washington D.C.
  - Ronald Reagan Washington National Airport station, Washington Metro rapid transit station
- Reagan National University, a diploma mill
- Reagan National Advertising; see City of Austin v. Reagan National Advertising of Austin, LLC

== See also ==
- Reagan (disambiguation)
- National (disambiguation)
