= Ronald Reagan (disambiguation) =

Ronald Reagan (1911–2004) was the 40th president of the United States from 1981 to 1989.

Ronald Reagan or Ron Reagan may also refer to:

- Ron Reagan (born 1958), son of the 40th U.S. president
- Ron Reagan (Florida politician) (born 1954), member of the Florida House of Representatives
- Ronald Reagan Washington National Airport, an airport near Washington, D.C.
  - Ronald Reagan Washington National Airport station, a Washington Metro station
- USS Ronald Reagan, a nuclear-powered supercarrier
- Ronald Reagan UCLA Medical Center, a medical center in the campus of University of California, Los Angeles

== See also ==
- Donald Regan
- List of things named after Ronald Reagan
- Presidency of Ronald Reagan
- Reagan (disambiguation)
