= Monte Attell =

American boxer (1885–1960)

Personal information
- Nickname: The Nob Hill Terror
- Born: July 28, 1885 San Francisco, California, US
- Died: November 11, 1960 (aged 75) Palo Alto, California, US
- Height: 5 ft 4 in (1.63 m)
- Weight: Bantamweight champion

Boxing career
- Reach: 67 in (170 cm)
- Stance: Orthodox

Boxing record
- Total fights: 137
- Wins: 66
- Win by KO: 30
- Losses: 41
- Draws: 28
- No contests: 2

Monte Attell (July 28, 1885 – November 11, 1960), was an American boxer who held the world bantamweight title from 1909 to 1910. Born in the Nob Hill in San Francisco, he was the younger brother of featherweight champion Abe Attell. In 1909, the brothers became the first siblings to hold world boxing titles at the same time. Attell won the vacant bantamweight title by defeating former champion Frankie Neil on June 19, 1909, and lost it to Frankie Conley on February 22, 1910.

== Early life and career ==
Attell was born on July 28, 1885, to a struggling Jewish family that, by one account, eventually had eighteen children. As a poor Jewish kid of diminutive stature raised in a tough Irish neighborhood, Attell began his career as a fighter from a very early age. As his older brother Abe Attell (1884–1970) was the Featherweight Champion of the World during the same period, Monte and Abe became the first brothers to simultaneously hold world boxing titles. Their brother, Caesar, also fought and was called "Two and a Half," for always giving that amount whenever the hat was passed for charity at boxing events. Like his brother Abe, Monte spent some of his youth and likely some of his later life selling newspapers for a living. At the age of 14, Attell was treated for burns to the face and hands from a childhood accident with a toy cannon which may have contributed to his decline as a boxer as he aged.

From fighting for survival in the streets, Monte Attell turned professional by 1902, winning his first five bouts. He lost several of his early bouts, but between February 1906 and May 1909, he won ten continuous matches. His performance earned him a chance to fight for the vacant Bantamweight championship in 1909.

Before his world Bantamweight championship bout, Attell defeated Dusty Miller on November 5, 1904, in a six-round points decision at the Chicago Athletic Club. Two weeks later, Attell defeated Miller again at the West End Athletic Club in St. Louis, in a ten-round points decision. In their bout in St. Louis, Attell had the lead throughout, boring in constantly, and defending with skill. Miller fought back gamely, but Attell clearly held the better hand. In the fifth to the ninth rounds, Miller stalled, and though he rallied in the tenth, the round finished even. Attell received the decision for his ability to penetrate Miller's defenses with stronger, if at times less frequent blows.

Attell knocked out Johnny Reagan on December 22, 1904, in seventeen rounds in St. Louis. Though the first nine rounds were close, and Reagan knocked down Attell in the sixth, from the thirteenth through the seventeenth, Attell took the advantage. In the seventeenth, a left and right to the jaw, preceded by a single blow to the chin sent Reagan to the canvas for the full count. In two previous meetings at St. Louis's West End Club, Attell had won in a close fifteen round points decision in St. Louis on December 15, 1904, and in an eighth round points decision the previous month.

=== Loss to flyweight champ Owen Moran, 1905 ===
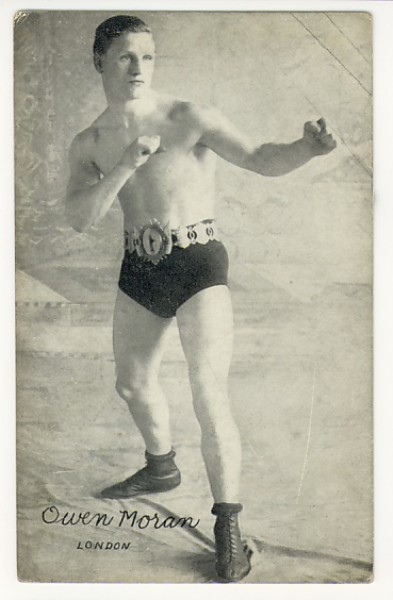
Attell lost to accomplished British boxer Owen Moran (pictured) on May 15, 1905.

Attell lost to accomplished British boxer Owen Moran on May 15, 1905, in a twenty-round points decision at the Pallisades in New York before a private, affluent crowd of around 150, who paid as much as $10 to see the fight, a princely sum in that era. Moran held the BBBC Flyweight Championship of Great Britain in 1903 and would compete several times for the Bantamweight Championship of his native land. Moran fought with more telling blows which won him the decision. By the sixth, both fighters were fatigued, and in the seventh, Moran hooked a strong left to the jaw of Attell staggering him and causing him to fall against the ropes as the round ended. Moran tried to finish Attell through the final ten rounds, but was unable, as his opponent would retreat or clinch to save himself. The bout caused a serious eye injury to Attell which became permanent and eventually led to blindness.

On March 29, 1905, Attell fought Jimmy Walsh in Philadelphia in what many sources considered a World Bantamweight Title match that ended when the referee called a disqualification against Walsh in the sixth round for a low blow. One source noted that Walsh, "had the better of the bout from the start", and that the blow which occurred two minutes into the sixth round was accidental. Attell claimed to have been injured, and a foul was called by the referee, but Walsh was recognized as the Bantamweight Champion, by the National Boxing Association.

In an early loss against a known competitor, Attell lost to Freddie Weeks on September 3, 1906, in a fifth-round knockout at the Grand Opera House at Victor, Colorado. Weeks was a quick and scrappy competitor who fought some of the best, including Monte's brother Abe in October 1907 and January 1909 in unsuccessful title matches for the World Featherweight Championship.

Attell defeated Mike Kutchos on November 25, 1908, for the Pacific Coast Bantamweight Title, winning in a fifteen-round points decision.

Attell drew with Jimmy Walsh at the Colliseum in San Francisco in a fifteen-round points decision on December 21, 1908. Walsh claimed to hold the World Bantamweight Title at the time, and the bout was billed as a World Bantamweight Title match for the limit of 116 pounds, but no title officially changed hands, as Walsh was overweight. As was typically the case with Attell, he was superior in the infighting, but Walsh lead and was more aggressive in the bout, and he may have landed the more telling blows, accounting for the draw decision. In the fifteenth, Walsh battered Attell badly making up any lead Attell enjoyed, and Attell's face appeared far more battered at the end of the bout.

== World bantamweight champion, 1909 ==
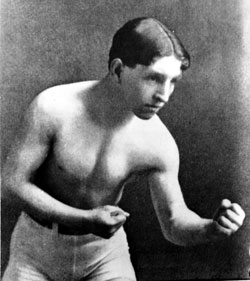
Frankie Neil, 1904 Bantamweight Champion

On June 19, 1909, Monte Attell won the World Bantamweight title defeating former champion Frankie Neil at Coffroth's Arena, in an eighteenth-round knockout in Colma, California. The bout was billed as a championship for the world bantamweight title. According to W. W. Naughton writing for the Oakland Tribune, Attell won every round of the eighteen round bout, which was ended by a full left handed blow to the chin of Frankie Neil. Neil reportedly "took a terrible mauling without flinching. From the very first it was apparent that the only chance Neil had was to outgame Attell and wear him down by persistent rushing for he was being outpunched at least two to one and the blows of the Hebrew fighter (Attell) were not the easiest either." Though Neil was the aggressor through much of the bout, Attell "peppered Neil with straight lefts", brought crushing rights to the jaw, and delivered solid rights to the midsection that eventually took their toll on his opponent. In the fifteenth, Neil was down from a left to the stomach, and twice he stumbled to his hands and knees in the clinches. He was nearly finished at the end of the round from lefts and rights but was saved by the fifteenth's closing bell. Though Attell could not finish Neil in the next two rounds, but in the eighteenth, as Neil first approached, Attell finished him with a straight left to the jaw that put him down for the count. Neil had last held the title in 1904, before losing it to British bantamweight Joe Bowker.

In the seven months following his winning the title on June 19, 1909, Attell successfully defended it seven times.

=== Title matches with Jimmy Reagan, 1909 ===
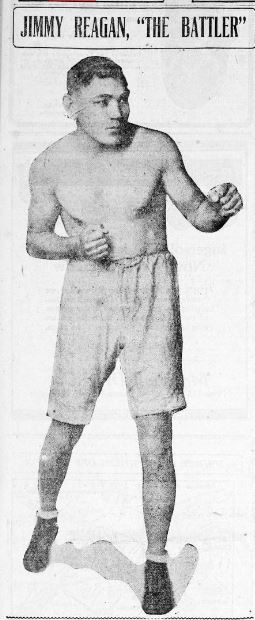
Jimmy Reagan

He fought Jimmy Reagan on February 22, 1909, in a World Bantamweight Title match that resulted in a twenty-round points decision at the Mission Street Arena in San Francisco, California. In this match, Attell was down four times in the early rounds, though he came back quickly. The Oakland Tribune had Attell winning every round after the seventh. On August 11, 1909, he successfully and more decisively defended his title once again against Jimmy Reagan in a fourth-round knockout in Oakland, California. Attell stood toe to toe with Reagan and "outfoxed, outboxed, and outgeneralled him". Attell was noted to have fought excellently in close, while maintaining an excellent defense, ducking, dodging, and blocking with great effect. He had fought Reagan earlier in a non-title match in Oakland, California, on November 30, 1908, that resulted in a fifteen-round points decision.

=== World bantam title defenses ===
==== Percy Cove ====
On August 20, 1909, Attell defeated Percy Cove in a title bout and retained the world bantamweight championship in a tenth-round technical knockout before a packed house at the Mission Athletic Club in San Francisco. A left drive to the jaw in the tenth round put Cove against the ropes and nearly helpless in the tenth, though he had fought valiantly in the early rounds. By the third round, Attell was connecting hooks to the stomach of Cove and getting under his attempts to block, though Cove's considerable advantage in reach and height served him well in the first two rounds. In the remaining rounds, Attell used blows to the stomach, followed by lefts to the face to even the match and take a lead in points. Cove's left knocked down Attell once in the second, but Attell's advantage in the remaining rounds took the starch out of Cove's blows.

==== Daniel Webster ====
Attell drew with Daniel Webster on October 12, 1909, in another bantamweight title match. In this no decision bout, a win required agreement by two of three newspapers as to who had won the match, and since two Los Angeles newspapers called the fight even, it was officially declared a draw. Attell drew with Webster twice more in bantamweight title matches, once in a ten-round match in Los Angeles in November, 1909 and once in a twenty-round match in San Francisco in December of that year.

==== Phil McGovern ====
In a bout billed as a world bantamweight title match on January 30, 1911, Attell won a ten-round newspaper decision to retain his title against Phil McGovern, brother to champion Terry McGovern, at the Athletic Club in Brooklyn. In a close and brutal bout, McGovern sent Attell to the floor three times in the first round. The New York Tribune wrote that Attell traded punches with McGovern at three to one, and used his advantage in height and reach as well as a hard, straight punch that crossed inside to win their newspaper decision. Attell was down in the second as well from a swing to the jaw, though he rose quickly after his trip to the mat. McGovern sensed a quick victory, but Attell stood him off with straight lefts. McGovern's aggressiveness made the bout look like a contest, and his ability to take his time with his opponent and effectively use lefts to the face, won him the decision of the New York Tribune. Newspapers were divided on who had won the bout, but the local papers, The New York Times, and Brooklyn Daily Eagle favored Attell as the winner. The Brooklyn Daily Eagle wrote that Attell used stabbing lefts to counter McGovern's advances in the fourth and fifth. After the fifth, Attell's left to the face and right cross to the jaw dominated the bout, and took the steam from McGovern. In the ninth and tenth, McGovern staged an ineffective rally, and was stopped by Attell's counterpunches.

==== Johnny Daly ====
Attell defeated Johnny Daly in a world bantamweight title match on October 2, 1911, in a close ten round points decision in New Orleans, Louisiana. The decision was not popular with the crowd, and the police stepped into the ring to protect the boxers. Attell, having a longer reach, used his left to shove back Daly's face to gain an opening, and then connected with his right to the chin or chest on multiple occasions. Daly's strong left failed often to reach its target against the rapid maneuvers of Attell, who showed better defensive ringcraft. By the tenth round, Attell's right eye was a frequent object of Daly's who connected with two lefts.

=== Bouts with Jimmy Carroll ===
Attell defeated Jimmy Carroll in a ten-round newspaper decision on October 26, 1909, at Piedmont Pavilion in Oakland. The Los Angeles Times wrote that "from the tap of the bell in the first round, he (Attell) took the aggressive and never once allowed Carroll the upper hand." Attell, who had been training and taking fights in the months preceding the contest, unlike Carroll, showed greater endurance and by the fifth this showed most strongly as he began to throw the most telling punches against Carroll. Carroll was down for a count of seven in the fifth. In the tenth round, Carroll tried to score enough points to gain a draw decision, but Attell was too far ahead on points and won the decision of most newspapers. Attell came in close with both hands, fighting a successful bout from the first to the final rounds. In their first meeting on January 12, 1904, Attell knocked out Carroll, only 1:59 seconds into the first round at Colma, California. In a subsequent meeting with Carroll on February 15, 1907, he fought a four-round draw in a points decision in San Francisco. Only two months later, on April 5, 1907, he lost to Carroll in a four-round points decision at Dreamland Pavilion in San Francisco.

A year later on March 14, 1908, in one of their more well publicized bouts, Attell drew with Carroll in a fifteen-round points decision at Coffroth's Arena in San Francisco. Carroll, who was outweighed by Attell, fought on the aggressive and evened the points scoring as Attell fought more defensively in the later rounds of the bout. Carroll, who was much slimmer than Attell, scored repeatedly with straight lefts, but did more poorly in the infighting, where Attell excelled. In the only knockdown of the fight, Attell sent Carroll to the canvas with a hard right to the chin, but was unable to score knockdowns in the subsequent rounds, where Carroll defended well, except in the infighting, making a draw decision a reasonable choice.

== Loss of Bantam title, 1910 ==
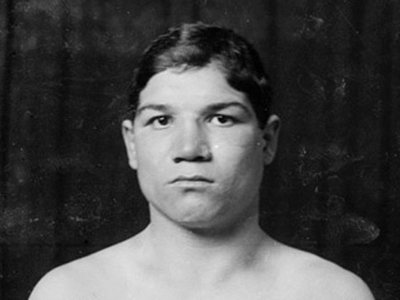
Frankie Conley in 1910

Attell lost the world bantamweight championship to Frankie Conley on February 22, 1910, at the Pacific Athletic Club in Vernon, California, when Conley knocked him out in the 42nd round of a scheduled 45-round bout.

Conley's knockout win was something of a surprise to the audience, as he was only 20, and Attell was a well established champion. Conley staggered Attell with a right to the jaw in the thirteenth, but the first twenty rounds seemed rather even. By the 33rd round Attell seemed physically diminished from a blow to the chest from Conley. Astonishingly, neither men were down in the grueling bout until Attell took his final dive in the 42nd round. Attell's left eye was closed, and he appeared to have taken worse injuries than his opponent. The grueling three hour spectacle ended when Conley knocked out Attell with a strong right. Some sources may give an earlier date as to when Attell first relinquished the World Bantamweight Title.

After losing the title, Attell continued to fight regularly. On February 11, 1911, he fought a six-round draw with Joe Biderberg, known as Louisiana, at Old City Hall in Pittsburgh. Louisiana held frequently in clinches, likely tired and wary of the blows of Attell. Louisiana had the better of the outside boxing, showing great defense and ducking, but Attell excelled at the infighting, as was typical of his style. Louisiana showed better speed and was more illusive but Attell's superior infighting, though brutal at times, made the decision of most newspapers a draw.

On December 14, 1911, he defeated Patsy Brannigan by six-round newspaper decision at Duquesne Garden in Pittsburgh. Pittsburgh Post accounts credited Attell’s infighting and cleaner punches, though some reports argued that Brannigan’s late-round aggression should have earned him the decision.

== Boxing decline, eye injury ==
Attell first fought Johnny Kilbane, future world featherweight champion from 1912 to 1923, on March 24, 1911, drawing in ten rounds in Cleveland, Ohio. One reporter noted that Kilbane injured his right hand in the first round and could only push it into Attell's face when he half clinched, though he did damage with his strong right throughout the bout. Kilbane landed a storm of punches in the second round. Attell fought very aggressively and got in left slams to the body as well as stiff counterpunches to Kilbane's face. On December 3, 1912, losing to Kilbane in a ninth-round technical knockout in Cleveland, Ohio, Attell was down more than six times before the police ordered the bout stopped to prevent a knockout. Kilbane became the aggressor in the second round and for much of the remainder of the bout, Attell had to cover up to save himself from Kibane's fierce attack.

In a well publicized match, Attell lost to Al Delmont on April 12, 1911, in a twelve-round points decision in Boston. In the first two rounds, Delmont gained a considerable lead with lefts and rights to the face, but in the next seven rounds, Delmont clinched often, while Attell shot his left to the face and body and his right to the ribs. Delmont occasionally got his right to Attell's face and landed right counters. With jabs and right crosses to the face and jaw, Delmont, showing his old form, earned a sufficient points margin in the eleventh and twelfth, to gain the popular decision.

In a close bout, Attell again lost to Delmont in a twelve-round points decision on April 18, 1911, in the Arena in Boston. In a very close and hard-fought bout, Delmont did considerable jabbing, and Attell went to the body often with both hands. The eleventh round saw Delmont taking the lead, and in the twelfth his more aggressive fighting won him the very close decision.

Sometime in 1914, Attell incurred an eye injury that became infected, and eventually resulted in a loss of sight in the eye.

Future world bantamweight champion, Joe Lynch knocked out Attell in the seventh round of a scheduled ten round bout at the Pioneer Sporting Club on September 5, 1916, in East Liverpool, Ohio. Lynch would hold the world bantamweight championship in the early 1920s. Attell was down in the first round.

Attell lost to Young Zulu Kid on June 24, 1916, in a ten-round newspaper decision of the New York Evening Telegram at the Fairmont Athletic Club in The Bronx. Despite a significant reach advantage over the diminutive Italian boxer, Attell lost the bout to the Kid who fought several quality competitors but lacked a winning record against them. The Kid had contended for the world flyweight title unsuccessfully on December 16, 1916, and would later contend for the American flyweight title.

Attell fought top-rated boxer Frankie Britt near the end of his career on September 15, 1916, losing in a third-round knockout in Boston. The final blow was a short right to the jaw, delivered by Britt. Attell was reported in less than peak condition. Tellingly, though not unusual for an aging boxer in the era, particularly one with vision problems, Attell lost nineteen of twenty-four bouts between February 7, 1912, and October 30, 1916, near the end of his boxing career.

== Retirement, and death ==
Attell initially retired from boxing in 1916, largely as the result of an eye infection that eventually led to his going blind in the eye. He had lost most of his vision in the other eye as a result of injuries sustained during his fight with Owen Moran in May 1905. One of his last bouts was a seven-round knockout loss on October 30, 1916, to Marty Taylor, known as Kid Taylor, a featherweight who had fought but not beaten several quality boxers. In his youth, he had knocked out Taylor on April 21, 1905, in New York.

In a final return to boxing on January 19, 1917, Attell lost to Manchester boxer Joe Morgan in Boston. Attell received a terrific lacing in the fifth, and appeared to be behind on points in every round, before he was put down for the count in the sixth by his opponent. Although he had fought some quality opposition, Attell did not win a single fight in 1916.

In time, a failed business and the Great Depression of the late 1920s and early 1930s wiped out his savings. By February 1923, according to one source, Attell was short on funds, blind, and residing at the Alameda County Hospital. While blind, he was forced at one point to sell peanuts and cigarettes at fights to raise money, while a young man led him to his customers. Hearing of his plight, Jack Dempsey later financed a cigar stand in San Francisco that supplied Attell a decent living for many years. He was married to wife Mary, formerly Mary Forman, but had no children of their own. In 1957, he suffered a heart attack and retired to Palo Alto for a period. He died in 1960 at his home on South Court in Palo Alto.

== Professional boxing record ==
All information in this section is derived from BoxRec, unless otherwise stated.

=== Official record ===
137 fights	57 wins	28 losses
By knockout	30	7
By decision	24	20
By disqualification	3	1
Draws	21	
No contests	2	
Newspaper decisions/draws	29	

All newspaper decisions are officially regarded as “no decision” bouts and are not counted in the win/loss/draw column.

No.	Result	Record	Opponent	Type	Round, time	Date	Location	Notes
137	Loss	57–28–21 (31)	Marty 'Kid' Taylor	NWS	10	Oct 30, 1916	Military A.C., New York City, New York, US	
136	Loss	57–27–21 (31)	Young Bill Murphy	NWS	10	Sep 23, 1916	Staten I. S.C., New York City, New York, US	
135	Loss	57–27–21 (30)	Frankie Britt	KO	3 (12)	Sep 15, 1916	Commercial A.C., Boston, Massachusetts, US	
134	Loss	57–26–21 (30)	Joe Lynch	KO	7 (10)	Sep 6, 1916	Pioneer Sporting Club, New York City, New York, US	
133	Loss	57–25–21 (30)	Buddy Faulkes	NWS	10	Aug 4, 1916	Harlem S.C., New York City, New York, US	
132	ND	57–25–21 (29)	Willie Brown	ND	10	Aug 3, 1916	Arveme Sporting Club, Arvene, New York, US	
131	Loss	57–25–21 (28)	Young Zulu Kid	NWS	10	Jun 24, 1916	Fairmont A.C., New York City, New York, US	
130	Loss	57–25–21 (27)	Jimmy Carroll	PTS	4	Mar 31, 1916	Dreamland Rink, San Francisco, California, US	
129	Draw	57–24–21 (27)	Tex Vernon	PTS	10	Jun 29, 1914	Aberdeen, Washington, US	
128	Loss	57–24–20 (27)	Willie Fitzsimmons	PTS	10	Jun 9, 1914	West Oakland Club, Oakland, California, US	
127	Draw	57–23–20 (27)	Tex Vernon	PTS	10	Apr 28, 1914	Eagles Hall, Aberdeen, Washington, US	
126	Loss	57–23–19 (27)	Jimmy Fox	PTS	12	Mar 16, 1914	Butte, Montana, US	
125	Loss	57–22–19 (27)	Cal Delaney	PTS	4	Jun 13, 1913	Dreamland Rink, San Francisco, California, US	
124	Loss	57–21–19 (27)	Ad Zotte	PTS	20	May 29, 1913	Midvale, Utah, US	
123	Loss	57–20–19 (27)	Cal Delaney	PTS	10	May 20, 1913	Vernon, California, US	
122	Draw	57–19–19 (27)	Roy Moore	PTS	10	May 1, 1913	Reno, Nevada, US	
121	Draw	57–19–18 (27)	Ad Zotte	PTS	15	Apr 29, 1913	Trocadero Hall, Murray, Utah, US	
120	Loss	57–19–17 (27)	Ad Zotte	PTS	4	Apr 4, 1913	Dreamland Rink, San Francisco, California, US	
119	Draw	57–18–17 (27)	Ad Zotte	PTS	10	Feb 12, 1913	Hub City A.C., Stockton, California, US	
118	Loss	57–18–16 (27)	Johnny Kilbane	TKO	9 (12), 1:30	Dec 3, 1912	Tuxedo Club, Cleveland, Ohio, US	
117	Draw	57–17–16 (27)	Patsy Brannigan	NWS	12	Oct 29, 1912	Youngstown, Ohio, US	
116	Loss	57–17–16 (26)	Benny Chavez	DQ	12 (20)	Sep 2, 1912	Trinidad, Colorado, US	
115	Loss	57–16–16 (26)	Willie Gibbs	PTS	10	Jul 20, 1912	Greenwall Theater, New Orleans, Louisiana, US	
114	Draw	57–15–16 (26)	Patsy Brannigan	NWS	6	May 11, 1912	Old City Hall, Pittsburgh, Pennsylvania, US	
113	Loss	57–15–16 (25)	Johnny Creeley	NWS	6	Mar 16, 1912	Old City Hall, Pittsburgh, Pennsylvania, US	
112	Loss	57–15–16 (24)	Patsy Brannigan	NWS	10	Mar 11, 1912	Lawrence Rink, New Castle, Pennsylvania, US	
111	Loss	57–15–16 (23)	Johnny Creeley	NWS	6	Feb 26, 1912	Old City Hall, Pittsburgh, Pennsylvania, US	
110	Loss	57–15–16 (22)	Chick Hayes	NWS	12	Feb 7, 1912	Indianapolis, Indiana, US	
109	Draw	57–15–16 (21)	Johnny Griffiths	NWS	12	Jan 30, 1912	Akron, Ohio, US	
108	Loss	57–15–16 (20)	Chick Hayes	NWS	10	Jan 24, 1912	Auditorium, Indianapolis, Indiana, US	
107	Win	57–15–16 (19)	Jim Kenrick	NWS	6	Jan 8, 1912	Old City Hall, Pittsburgh, Pennsylvania, US	
106	Win	57–15–16 (18)	Patsy Brannigan	NWS	6	Dec 18, 1911	Old City Hall, Pittsburgh, Pennsylvania, US	
105	Win	57–15–16 (17)	Johnny Creeley	NWS	6	Dec 5, 1911	Pittsburgh A.C., Pittsburgh, Pennsylvania, US	
104	Loss	57–15–16 (16)	Frankie Burns	NWS	10	Oct 23, 1911	Orleans A.C., New Orleans, California, US	
103	Win	57–15–16 (15)	Johnny Daly	PTS	10	Oct 2, 1911	Orleans A.C., New Orleans, California, US	Retained world bantamweight title claim
102	Draw	56–15–16 (15)	Tommy Dixon	PTS	10	Sep 11, 1911	Orleans A.C., New Orleans, California, US	
101	Draw	56–15–15 (15)	Jimmy Reagan	PTS	20	Jul 25, 1911	Buffalo A.C., Sacramento, California, US	
100	Draw	56–15–14 (15)	Jimmy Carroll	PTS	4	Jun 30, 1911	Dreamland Rink, San Francisco, California, US	
99	Loss	56–15–13 (15)	Al Delmont	PTS	12	Apr 18, 1911	Arena (Armory A.A.), Boston, Massachusetts, US	
98	Loss	56–14–13 (15)	Al Delmont	PTS	12	Apr 11, 1911	Boston, Massachusetts, US	
97	Draw	56–13–13 (15)	Johnny Kilbane	PTS	10	Mar 24, 1911	Cleveland, Ohio, US	
96	Win	56–13–12 (15)	Patsy Brannigan	NWS	6	Mar 14, 1911	Duquesne Garden, Pittsburgh, Pennsylvania, US	
95	Win	56–13–12 (14)	Phil McGovern	NWS	6	Feb 25, 1911	Labor Temple, Pittsburgh, Pennsylvania, US	
94	Draw	56–13–12 (13)	Joseph Biderberg	NWS	6	Feb 11, 1911	Old City Hall, Pittsburgh, Pennsylvania, US	
93	Loss	56–13–12 (12)	Young Britt	PTS	15	Jan 31, 1911	Germania Maennerchor Hall, Baltimore, Maryland, US	
92	Win	56–12–12 (12)	Phil McGovern	NWS	10	Jan 30, 1911	Vanderbilt A.C., New York City, New York, US	World bantamweight title claim at stake; (via KO only)
91	Win	56–12–12 (11)	Jeddy McFadden	KO	1 (6)	Jan 21, 1911	Old City Hall, Pittsburgh, Pennsylvania, US	
90	Win	55–12–12 (11)	Billy Wagner	PTS	15	Dec 23, 1910	Tulsa, Oklahoma, US	
89	NC	54–12–12 (11)	Jeff O'Connell	NC	5 (10)	Dec 14, 1910	Oklahoma City, Oklahoma, US	Fight stopped for tame action
88	Win	54–12–12 (10)	Jimmy Walsh	PTS	10	Nov 23, 1910	Kansas City, Missouri, US	Claimed world bantamweight title
87	Win	53–12–12 (10)	Johnny Albanese	NWS	6	Nov 12, 1910	Old City Hall, Pittsburgh, Pennsylvania, US	
86	Win	53–12–12 (9)	Rudy Morvic	KO	7 (?)	Sep 15, 1910	Bakersfield, California, US	
85	Loss	52–12–12 (9)	Jimmy Carroll	PTS	4	Aug 26, 1910	Dreamland Rink, San Francisco, California, US	
84	Loss	52–11–12 (9)	Patsy Brannigan	NWS	6	Jun 20, 1910	Duquesne Garden, Pittsburgh, Pennsylvania, US	
83	Win	52–11–12 (8)	Young Britt	PTS	15	Jun 14, 1910	Momumental Theater, Baltimore, Maryland, US	
82	Loss	51–11–12 (8)	Patsy Brannigan	NWS	6	Jun 6, 1910	Duquesne Garden, Pittsburgh, Pennsylvania, US	
81	Draw	51–11–12 (7)	Young O'Leary	NWS	10	May 6, 1910	New York City, New York, US	
80	Loss	51–11–12 (6)	Joe Wagner	NWS	10	Apr 27, 1910	National S.C., New York City, New York, US	
79	Loss	51–11–12 (5)	Frankie Conley	TKO	42 (45)	Feb 22, 1910	Jeffries' Arena, Vernon, California, US	Lost world bantamweight title
78	Win	51–10–12 (5)	Jimmy Carroll	NWS	10	Dec 30, 1909	Exposition Rink, Saint Johns, Oregon, US	World bantamweight title at stake; (via KO only)
77	Draw	51–10–12 (4)	Danny Webster	PTS	20	Dec 17, 1909	Dreamland Rink, San Francisco, California, US	Retained world bantamweight title
76	Draw	51–10–11 (4)	Danny Webster	NWS	10	Nov 23, 1909	McCarey's Pavilion, Los Angeles, California, US	World bantamweight title at stake; (via KO only)
75	Win	51–10–11 (3)	Jimmy Carroll	PTS	10	Oct 26, 1909	Piedmont Pavilion, Oakland, California, US	
74	Draw	50–10–11 (3)	Danny Webster	NWS	10	Oct 12, 1909	Naud Junction Arena, Los Angeles, California, US	World bantamweight title at stake; (via KO only)
73	Win	50–10–11 (2)	Percy Cove	TKO	10 (20)	Aug 20, 1909	Mission A.C., San Francisco, California, US	Retained world bantamweight title
72	Win	49–10–11 (2)	Jimmy Reagan	KO	4 (10)	Aug 11, 1909	Piedmont Pavilion, Oakland, California, US	Retained world bantamweight title
71	Win	48–10–11 (2)	Frankie Neil	KO	18 (45)	Jun 19, 1909	Coffroth's Arena, Colma, California, US	Won vacant world bantamweight title
70	Win	47–10–11 (2)	Fred Bennett	PTS	6	May 6, 1909	Wheelmen Club, Oakland, California, US	
69	Win	46–10–11 (2)	Bobby Johnson	KO	3 (20)	May 1, 1909	Winnemucca, Nevada, US	
68	Win	45–10–11 (2)	Harry Dell	PTS	15	Mar 26, 1909	Dreamland Rink, San Francisco, California, US	
67	Win	44–10–11 (2)	Jimmy Reagan	PTS	20	Feb 22, 1909	Mission Street Arena, San Francisco, California, US	Retained world bantamweight title claim; Won world bantamweight title claim
66	Draw	43–10–11 (2)	Jimmy Walsh	PTS	15	Dec 21, 1908	Coliseum, San Francisco, California, US	For world bantamweight title claim; Both fighters claimed the title
65	Draw	43–10–10 (2)	Jimmy Reagan	PTS	15	Nov 30, 1908	Dreamland Pavilon, Oakland, California, US	
64	Win	43–10–9 (2)	Mike Kutchos	PTS	15	Nov 25, 1908	Jeffries' Arena, Vernon, California, US	Won vacant Pacific Coast bantamweight title
63	Win	42–10–9 (2)	Bobby Johnson	KO	2 (20)	Oct 22, 1908	Reno, Nevada, US	
62	Win	41–10–9 (2)	Ed Derby	KO	3 (?)	Sep 11, 1908	Reno, Nevada, US	
61	Draw	40–10–9 (2)	Fred Bennett	PTS	20	Sep 9, 1908	Redding, California, US	
60	Win	40–10–8 (2)	Dick Murray	KO	2 (?)	May 1, 1908	Sacramento, California, US	
59	Draw	39–10–8 (2)	Jimmy Carroll	PTS	15	Mar 14, 1908	Coffroth's Arena, San Francisco, California, US	
58	Win	39–10–7 (2)	Al Emmick	PTS	20	Oct 22, 1907	Sacramento, California, US	
57	Win	38–10–7 (2)	Kid Molan	KO	2 (?)	Sep 27, 1907	Sacramento, California, US	
56	Win	37–10–7 (2)	Al Emmick	KO	14 (?)	Sep 10, 1907	Sacramento, California, US	
55	Win	36–10–7 (2)	Kid Barlett	PTS	6	Jul 4, 1907	Los Angeles, California, US	
54	Win	35–10–7 (2)	Louis Burns	KO	4 (?)	May 16, 1907	San Francisco, California, US	
53	Draw	34–10–7 (2)	Eddie Menney	PTS	4	May 10, 1907	Dreamland Pavilion, San Francisco, California, US	
52	Loss	34–10–6 (2)	Jimmy Carroll	PTS	4	Apr 5, 1907	Dreamland Pavilion, San Francisco, California, US	
51	Win	34–9–6 (2)	Eddie Webber	PTS	4	Mar 28, 1907	San Francisco, California, US	
50	Draw	33–9–6 (2)	Jimmy Carroll	PTS	4	Feb 15, 1907	Dreamland Pavilion, San Francisco, California, US	
49	Loss	33–9–5 (2)	Freddie Weeks	KO	5 (20)	Sep 3, 1906	Grand Opera House, Victor, Colorado, US	
48	Win	33–8–5 (2)	Mike Bartley	PTS	6	May 11, 1906	Naud Junction Pavilion, Los Angeles, California, US	
47	Win	32–8–5 (2)	Jockey Hogan	KO	2 (?)	Mar 5, 1906	Oakland, California, US	
46	Win	31–8–5 (2)	Fred Bennett	KO	11 (?)	Feb 22, 1906	Sacramento, California, US	
45	Loss	30–8–5 (2)	Fred Bennett	PTS	20	Jan 24, 1906	Sacramento, California, US	
44	Loss	30–7–5 (2)	Harry Tenny	KO	25 (25)	Sep 15, 1905	Goldfield, Nevada, US	
43	Loss	30–6–5 (2)	Owen Moran	PTS	20	May 15, 1905	Palisades, New York, US	
42	Win	30–5–5 (2)	Kid Taylor	KO	7 (?)	Apr 21, 1905	New York City, New York, US	
41	Win	29–5–5 (2)	Jimmy Walsh	DQ	6 (6)	Mar 29, 1905	National A.C., Philadelphia, Pennsylvania, US	For world bantamweight title claim; Walsh claims title after leading until DQ'd for a low blow
40	Loss	28–5–5 (2)	Jimmy Walsh	NWS	6	Mar 20, 1905	Washington S.C., Philadelphia, Pennsylvania, US	
39	Win	28–5–5 (1)	Johnny Reagan	KO	17 (20)	Dec 22, 1904	West End A.C., Saint Louis, Missouri, US	
38	Win	27–5–5 (1)	Johnny Reagan	PTS	15	Dec 15, 1904	West End A.C., Saint Louis, Missouri, US	
37	Win	26–5–5 (1)	Johnny Reagan	PTS	8	Nov 28, 1904	Blue Island, Illinois, US	
36	Win	25–5–5 (1)	Dusty Miller	NWS	10	Nov 19, 1904	West End A.C., Saint Louis, Missouri, US	
35	Win	25–5–5	Pete Leroy	KO	5 (?)	Nov 10, 1904	Chicago, Illinois, US	
34	Win	24–5–5	Dusty Miller	PTS	6	Nov 5, 1904	Chicago A.A., Chicago, Illinois, US	
33	Win	23–5–5	Pete Savoy	KO	5 (?)	Oct 29, 1904	Chicago, Illinois, US	
32	Loss	22–5–5	Bobby Johnson	PTS	15	Apr 8, 1904	Sequoia A.C., Oakland, California, US	
31	Win	22–4–5	Jimmy Carroll	KO	1 (?), 1:59	Jan 12, 1904	Colma A.C., Colma, California, US	
30	Win	21–4–5	Fred Bennett	KO	11 (?)	Nov 20, 1903	Sacramento, California, US	
29	Win	20–4–5	Willie Bourne	TKO	4 (6)	Jun 30, 1903	Mechanic's Pavilion, San Francisco, California, US	
28	Win	19–4–5	Al Mejia	DQ	5 (6)	May 29, 1903	Mechanic's Pavilion, San Francisco, California, US	
27	Draw	18–4–5	William H. Smith	PTS	6	Mar 12, 1903	Woodward's Pavilion, San Francisco, California, US	
26	Win	18–4–4	Bobby Johnson	DQ	6 (6)	Feb 26, 1903	Mechanic's Pavilion, San Francisco, California, US	
25	Win	17–4–4	Johnny Dugan	KO	3 (8)	Jan 20, 1903	Reliance A.C., Oakland, California, US	
24	Win	16–4–4	Willie Bourne	KO	4 (6)	Dec 23, 1902	Reliance A.C., Oakland, California, US	
23	Win	15–4–4	Billy Welsh	PTS	6	Dec 10, 1902	Acme A.C., Oakland, California, US	
22	Win	14–4–4	Al Mejia	PTS	4	Jul 31, 1902	Mechanic's Pavilion, San Francisco, California, US	
21	Loss	13–4–4	Al Mejia	PTS	4	Jul 30, 1902	Mechanics' Pavilion Annex, San Francisco, California, US	
20	Win	13–3–4	Mike Maher	KO	3 (4)	Jul 18, 1902	Olympic A.C., San Francisco, California, US	
19	Win	12–3–4	Al Mejia	PTS	4	Jul 15, 1902	Teutonia Hall, San Francisco, California, US	
18	Win	11–3–4	Mike Maher	KO	4 (4)	Jul 10, 1902	Mechanics' Pavilion Annex, San Francisco, California, US	
17	Win	10–3–4	Mike Maher	PTS	4	Jun 24, 1902	California, US	
16	Loss	9–3–4	Barney Driscoll	MD	4	Jun 17, 1902	Mechanics' Pavilion Annex, San Francisco, California, US	
15	Win	9–2–4	Joe O'Brien	KO	3 (4)	Jun 6, 1902	Mechanics' Pavilion Annex, San Francisco, California, US	
14	Loss	8–2–4	Barney Driscoll	SD	4	May 14, 1902	Olympic A.C., San Francisco, California, US	
13	Win	8–1–4	William Tardelli	TKO	3 (4)	May 13, 1902	Mechanic's Pavilion, San Francisco, California, US	
12	Win	7–1–4	Joe Reilly	PTS	4	May 7, 1902	Mechanics' Pavilion Annex, San Francisco, California, US	
11	Win	6–1–4	William Tardelli	PTS	4	Apr 15, 1902	Mechanics' Pavilion Annex, San Francisco, California, US	
10	Win	5–1–4	Pete Carroll	TKO	? (4)	Apr 3, 1902	Woodward's Pavilion, San Francisco, California, US	
9	Draw	4–1–4	Joe Carroll	PTS	4	Mar 28, 1902	San Francisco A.C., San Francisco, California, US	
8	Win	4–1–3	Pete Carroll	TKO	1 (4)	Mar 19, 1902	Mechanics' Pavilion Annex, San Francisco, California, US	
7	Win	3–1–3	Winnie Dunn	PTS	4	Mar 12, 1902	Mechanics' Pavilion Annex, San Francisco, California, US	
6	Win	2–1–3	Ed Jacobs	PTS	4	Feb 25, 1902	Mechanics' Pavilion Annex, San Francisco, California, US	
5	Win	1–1–3	Young Mitchell	KO	1 (4)	Feb 19, 1902	Mechanics' Pavilion Annex, San Francisco, California, US	
4	Loss	0–1–3	Bobby Johnson	PTS	4	Jan 28, 1902	Mechanics' Pavilion Annex, San Francisco, California, US	
3	Draw	0–0–3	Barney Driscoll	PTS	4	Jan 21, 1902	Mechanics' Pavilion Annex, San Francisco, California, US	
2	Draw	0–0–2	Pete Carroll	PTS	4	Dec 6, 1901	San Francisco A.C., San Francisco, California, US	
1	Draw	0–0–1	Barney Driscoll	PTS	4	Oct 31, 1901	Mechanics' Pavilion Annex, San Francisco, California, US	

=== Unofficial record ===
137 fights	66 wins	41 losses
By knockout	30	7
By decision	33	33
By disqualification	3	1
Draws	28	
No contests	2	

Record with the inclusion of newspaper decisions in the win/loss/draw column.

No.	Result	Record	Opponent	Type	Round	Date	Location	Notes
137	Loss	66–41–28 (2)	Marty 'Kid' Taylor	NWS	10	Oct 30, 1916	Military A.C., New York City, New York, US	
136	Loss	66–40–28 (2)	Young Bill Murphy	NWS	10	Sep 23, 1916	Staten I. S.C., New York City, New York, US	
135	Loss	66–39–28 (2)	Frankie Britt	KO	3 (12)	Sep 15, 1916	Commercial A.C., Boston, Massachusetts, US	
134	Loss	66–38–28 (2)	Joe Lynch	KO	7 (10)	Sep 6, 1916	Pioneer Sporting Club, New York City, New York, US	
133	Loss	66–37–28 (2)	Buddy Faulkes	NWS	10	Aug 4, 1916	Harlem S.C., New York City, New York, US	
132	ND	66–36–28 (2)	Willie Brown	ND	10	Aug 3, 1916	Arveme Sporting Club, Arvene, New York, US	
131	Loss	66–36–28 (1)	Young Zulu Kid	NWS	10	Jun 24, 1916	Fairmont A.C., New York City, New York, US	
130	Loss	66–35–28 (1)	Jimmy Carroll	PTS	4	Mar 31, 1916	Dreamland Rink, San Francisco, California, US	
129	Draw	66–34–28 (1)	Tex Vernon	PTS	10	Jun 29, 1914	Aberdeen, Washington, US	
128	Loss	66–34–27 (1)	Willie Fitzsimmons	PTS	10	Jun 9, 1914	West Oakland Club, Oakland, California, US	
127	Draw	66–33–27 (1)	Tex Vernon	PTS	10	Apr 28, 1914	Eagles Hall, Aberdeen, Washington, US	
126	Loss	66–33–26 (1)	Jimmy Fox	PTS	12	Mar 16, 1914	Butte, Montana, US	
125	Loss	66–32–26 (1)	Cal Delaney	PTS	4	Jun 13, 1913	Dreamland Rink, San Francisco, California, US	
124	Loss	66–31–26 (1)	Ad Zotte	PTS	20	May 29, 1913	Midvale, Utah, US	
123	Loss	66–30–26 (1)	Cal Delaney	PTS	10	May 20, 1913	Vernon, California, US	
122	Draw	66–29–26 (1)	Roy Moore	PTS	10	May 1, 1913	Reno, Nevada, US	
121	Draw	66–29–25 (1)	Ad Zotte	PTS	15	Apr 29, 1913	Trocadero Hall, Murray, Utah, US	
120	Loss	66–29–24 (1)	Ad Zotte	PTS	4	Apr 4, 1913	Dreamland Rink, San Francisco, California, US	
119	Draw	66–28–24 (1)	Ad Zotte	PTS	10	Feb 12, 1913	Hub City A.C., Stockton, California, US	
118	Loss	66–28–23 (1)	Johnny Kilbane	TKO	9 (12), 1:30	Dec 3, 1912	Tuxedo Club, Cleveland, Ohio, US	
117	Draw	66–27–23 (1)	Patsy Brannigan	NWS	12	Oct 29, 1912	Youngstown, Ohio, US	
116	Loss	66–27–22 (1)	Benny Chavez	DQ	12 (20)	Sep 2, 1912	Trinidad, Colorado, US	
115	Loss	66–26–22 (1)	Willie Gibbs	PTS	10	Jul 20, 1912	Greenwall Theater, New Orleans, Louisiana, US	
114	Draw	66–25–22 (1)	Patsy Brannigan	NWS	6	May 11, 1912	Old City Hall, Pittsburgh, Pennsylvania, US	
113	Loss	66–25–21 (1)	Johnny Creeley	NWS	6	Mar 16, 1912	Old City Hall, Pittsburgh, Pennsylvania, US	
112	Loss	66–24–21 (1)	Patsy Brannigan	NWS	10	Mar 11, 1912	Lawrence Rink, New Castle, Pennsylvania, US	
111	Loss	66–23–21 (1)	Johnny Creeley	NWS	6	Feb 26, 1912	Old City Hall, Pittsburgh, Pennsylvania, US	
110	Loss	66–22–21 (1)	Chick Hayes	NWS	12	Feb 7, 1912	Indianapolis, Indiana, US	
109	Draw	66–21–21 (1)	Johnny Griffiths	NWS	12	Jan 30, 1912	Akron, Ohio, US	
108	Loss	66–21–20 (1)	Chick Hayes	NWS	10	Jan 24, 1912	Auditorium, Indianapolis, Indiana, US	
107	Win	66–20–20 (1)	Jim Kenrick	NWS	6	Jan 8, 1912	Old City Hall, Pittsburgh, Pennsylvania, US	
106	Win	65–20–20 (1)	Patsy Brannigan	NWS	6	Dec 18, 1911	Old City Hall, Pittsburgh, Pennsylvania, US	
105	Win	64–20–20 (1)	Johnny Creeley	NWS	6	Dec 5, 1911	Pittsburgh A.C., Pittsburgh, Pennsylvania, US	
104	Loss	63–20–20 (1)	Frankie Burns	NWS	10	Oct 23, 1911	Orleans A.C., New Orleans, California, US	
103	Win	63–19–20 (1)	Johnny Daly	PTS	10	Oct 2, 1911	Orleans A.C., New Orleans, California, US	Retained world bantamweight title claim
102	Draw	62–19–20 (1)	Tommy Dixon	PTS	10	Sep 11, 1911	Orleans A.C., New Orleans, California, US	
101	Draw	62–19–19 (1)	Jimmy Reagan	PTS	20	Jul 25, 1911	Buffalo A.C., Sacramento, California, US	
100	Draw	62–19–18 (1)	Jimmy Carroll	PTS	4	Jun 30, 1911	Dreamland Rink, San Francisco, California, US	
99	Loss	62–19–17 (1)	Al Delmont	PTS	12	Apr 18, 1911	Arena (Armory A.A.), Boston, Massachusetts, US	
98	Loss	62–18–17 (1)	Al Delmont	PTS	12	Apr 11, 1911	Boston, Massachusetts, US	
97	Draw	62–17–17 (1)	Johnny Kilbane	PTS	10	Mar 24, 1911	Cleveland, Ohio, US	
96	Win	62–17–16 (1)	Patsy Brannigan	NWS	6	Mar 14, 1911	Duquesne Garden, Pittsburgh, Pennsylvania, US	
95	Win	61–17–16 (1)	Phil McGovern	NWS	6	Feb 25, 1911	Labor Temple, Pittsburgh, Pennsylvania, US	
94	Draw	60–17–16 (1)	Joseph Biderberg	NWS	6	Feb 11, 1911	Old City Hall, Pittsburgh, Pennsylvania, US	
93	Loss	60–17–15 (1)	Young Britt	PTS	15	Jan 31, 1911	Germania Maennerchor Hall, Baltimore, Maryland, US	
92	Win	60–16–15 (1)	Phil McGovern	NWS	10	Jan 30, 1911	Vanderbilt A.C., New York City, New York, US	World bantamweight title claim at stake; (via KO only)
91	Win	59–16–15 (1)	Jeddy McFadden	KO	1 (6)	Jan 21, 1911	Old City Hall, Pittsburgh, Pennsylvania, US	
90	Win	58–16–15 (1)	Billy Wagner	PTS	15	Dec 23, 1910	Tulsa, Oklahoma, US	
89	NC	57–16–15 (1)	Jeff O'Connell	NC	5 (10)	Dec 14, 1910	Oklahoma City, Oklahoma, US	Fight stopped for tame action
88	Win	57–16–15	Jimmy Walsh	PTS	10	Nov 23, 1910	Kansas City, Missouri, US	Claimed world bantamweight title
87	Win	56–16–15	Johnny Albanese	NWS	6	Nov 12, 1910	Old City Hall, Pittsburgh, Pennsylvania, US	
86	Win	55–16–15	Rudy Morvic	KO	7 (?)	Sep 15, 1910	Bakersfield, California, US	
85	Loss	54–16–15	Jimmy Carroll	PTS	4	Aug 26, 1910	Dreamland Rink, San Francisco, California, US	
84	Loss	54–15–15	Patsy Brannigan	NWS	6	Jun 20, 1910	Duquesne Garden, Pittsburgh, Pennsylvania, US	
83	Win	54–14–15	Young Britt	PTS	15	Jun 14, 1910	Momumental Theater, Baltimore, Maryland, US	
82	Loss	53–14–15	Patsy Brannigan	NWS	6	Jun 6, 1910	Duquesne Garden, Pittsburgh, Pennsylvania, US	
81	Draw	53–13–15	Young O'Leary	NWS	10	May 6, 1910	New York City, New York, US	
80	Loss	53–13–14	Joe Wagner	NWS	10	Apr 27, 1910	National S.C., New York City, New York, US	
79	Loss	53–12–14	Frankie Conley	TKO	42 (45)	Feb 22, 1910	Jeffries' Arena, Vernon, California, US	Lost world bantamweight title
78	Win	53–11–14	Jimmy Carroll	NWS	10	Dec 30, 1909	Exposition Rink, Saint Johns, Oregon, US	World bantamweight title at stake; (via KO only)
77	Draw	52–11–14	Danny Webster	PTS	20	Dec 17, 1909	Dreamland Rink, San Francisco, California, US	Retained world bantamweight title
76	Draw	52–11–13	Danny Webster	NWS	10	Nov 23, 1909	McCarey's Pavilion, Los Angeles, California, US	World bantamweight title at stake; (via KO only)
75	Win	52–11–12	Jimmy Carroll	PTS	10	Oct 26, 1909	Piedmont Pavilion, Oakland, California, US	
74	Draw	51–11–12	Danny Webster	NWS	10	Oct 12, 1909	Naud Junction Arena, Los Angeles, California, US	World bantamweight title at stake; (via KO only)
73	Win	51–11–11	Percy Cove	TKO	10 (20)	Aug 20, 1909	Mission A.C., San Francisco, California, US	Retained world bantamweight title
72	Win	50–11–11	Jimmy Reagan	KO	4 (10)	Aug 11, 1909	Piedmont Pavilion, Oakland, California, US	Retained world bantamweight title
71	Win	49–11–11	Frankie Neil	KO	18 (45)	Jun 19, 1909	Coffroth's Arena, Colma, California, US	Won vacant world bantamweight title
70	Win	48–11–11	Fred Bennett	PTS	6	May 6, 1909	Wheelmen Club, Oakland, California, US	
69	Win	47–11–11	Bobby Johnson	KO	3 (20)	May 1, 1909	Winnemucca, Nevada, US	
68	Win	46–11–11	Harry Dell	PTS	15	Mar 26, 1909	Dreamland Rink, San Francisco, California, US	
67	Win	45–11–11	Jimmy Reagan	PTS	20	Feb 22, 1909	Mission Street Arena, San Francisco, California, US	Retained world bantamweight title claim; Won world bantamweight title claim
66	Draw	44–11–11	Jimmy Walsh	PTS	15	Dec 21, 1908	Coliseum, San Francisco, California, US	For world bantamweight title claim; Both fighters claimed the title
65	Draw	44–11–10	Jimmy Reagan	PTS	15	Nov 30, 1908	Dreamland Pavilon, Oakland, California, US	
64	Win	44–11–9	Mike Kutchos	PTS	15	Nov 25, 1908	Jeffries' Arena, Vernon, California, US	Won vacant Pacific Coast bantamweight title
63	Win	43–11–9	Bobby Johnson	KO	2 (20)	Oct 22, 1908	Reno, Nevada, US	
62	Win	42–11–9	Ed Derby	KO	3 (?)	Sep 11, 1908	Reno, Nevada, US	
61	Draw	41–11–9	Fred Bennett	PTS	20	Sep 9, 1908	Redding, California, US	
60	Win	41–11–8	Dick Murray	KO	2 (?)	May 1, 1908	Sacramento, California, US	
59	Draw	40–11–8	Jimmy Carroll	PTS	15	Mar 14, 1908	Coffroth's Arena, San Francisco, California, US	
58	Win	40–11–7	Al Emmick	PTS	20	Oct 22, 1907	Sacramento, California, US	
57	Win	39–11–7	Kid Molan	KO	2 (?)	Sep 27, 1907	Sacramento, California, US	
56	Win	38–11–7	Al Emmick	KO	14 (?)	Sep 10, 1907	Sacramento, California, US	
55	Win	37–11–7	Kid Barlett	PTS	6	Jul 4, 1907	Los Angeles, California, US	
54	Win	36–11–7	Louis Burns	KO	4 (?)	May 16, 1907	San Francisco, California, US	
53	Draw	35–11–7	Eddie Menney	PTS	4	May 10, 1907	Dreamland Pavilion, San Francisco, California, US	
52	Loss	35–11–6	Jimmy Carroll	PTS	4	Apr 5, 1907	Dreamland Pavilion, San Francisco, California, US	
51	Win	35–10–6	Eddie Webber	PTS	4	Mar 28, 1907	San Francisco, California, US	
50	Draw	34–10–6	Jimmy Carroll	PTS	4	Feb 15, 1907	Dreamland Pavilion, San Francisco, California, US	
49	Loss	34–10–5	Freddie Weeks	KO	5 (20)	Sep 3, 1906	Grand Opera House, Victor, Colorado, US	
48	Win	34–9–5	Mike Bartley	PTS	6	May 11, 1906	Naud Junction Pavilion, Los Angeles, California, US	
47	Win	33–9–5	Jockey Hogan	KO	2 (?)	Mar 5, 1906	Oakland, California, US	
46	Win	32–9–5	Fred Bennett	KO	11 (?)	Feb 22, 1906	Sacramento, California, US	
45	Loss	31–9–5	Fred Bennett	PTS	20	Jan 24, 1906	Sacramento, California, US	
44	Loss	31–8–5	Harry Tenny	KO	25 (25)	Sep 15, 1905	Goldfield, Nevada, US	
43	Loss	31–7–5	Owen Moran	PTS	20	May 15, 1905	Palisades, New York, US	
42	Win	31–6–5	Kid Taylor	KO	7 (?)	Apr 21, 1905	New York City, New York, US	
41	Win	30–6–5	Jimmy Walsh	DQ	6 (6)	Mar 29, 1905	National A.C., Philadelphia, Pennsylvania, US	For world bantamweight title claim; Walsh claims title after leading until DQ'd for a low blow
40	Loss	29–6–5	Jimmy Walsh	NWS	6	Mar 20, 1905	Washington S.C., Philadelphia, Pennsylvania, US	
39	Win	29–5–5	Johnny Reagan	KO	17 (20)	Dec 22, 1904	West End A.C., Saint Louis, Missouri, US	
38	Win	28–5–5	Johnny Reagan	PTS	15	Dec 15, 1904	West End A.C., Saint Louis, Missouri, US	
37	Win	27–5–5	Johnny Reagan	PTS	8	Nov 28, 1904	Blue Island, Illinois, US	
36	Win	26–5–5	Dusty Miller	NWS	10	Nov 19, 1904	West End A.C., Saint Louis, Missouri, US	
35	Win	25–5–5	Pete Leroy	KO	5 (?)	Nov 10, 1904	Chicago, Illinois, US	
34	Win	24–5–5	Dusty Miller	PTS	6	Nov 5, 1904	Chicago A.A., Chicago, Illinois, US	
33	Win	23–5–5	Pete Savoy	KO	5 (?)	Oct 29, 1904	Chicago, Illinois, US	
32	Loss	22–5–5	Bobby Johnson	PTS	15	Apr 8, 1904	Sequoia A.C., Oakland, California, US	
31	Win	22–4–5	Jimmy Carroll	KO	1 (?), 1:59	Jan 12, 1904	Colma A.C., Colma, California, US	
30	Win	21–4–5	Fred Bennett	KO	11 (?)	Nov 20, 1903	Sacramento, California, US	
29	Win	20–4–5	Willie Bourne	TKO	4 (6)	Jun 30, 1903	Mechanic's Pavilion, San Francisco, California, US	
28	Win	19–4–5	Al Mejia	DQ	5 (6)	May 29, 1903	Mechanic's Pavilion, San Francisco, California, US	
27	Draw	18–4–5	William H. Smith	PTS	6	Mar 12, 1903	Woodward's Pavilion, San Francisco, California, US	
26	Win	18–4–4	Bobby Johnson	DQ	6 (6)	Feb 26, 1903	Mechanic's Pavilion, San Francisco, California, US	
25	Win	17–4–4	Johnny Dugan	KO	3 (8)	Jan 20, 1903	Reliance A.C., Oakland, California, US	
24	Win	16–4–4	Willie Bourne	KO	4 (6)	Dec 23, 1902	Reliance A.C., Oakland, California, US	
23	Win	15–4–4	Billy Welsh	PTS	6	Dec 10, 1902	Acme A.C., Oakland, California, US	
22	Win	14–4–4	Al Mejia	PTS	4	Jul 31, 1902	Mechanic's Pavilion, San Francisco, California, US	
21	Loss	13–4–4	Al Mejia	PTS	4	Jul 30, 1902	Mechanics' Pavilion Annex, San Francisco, California, US	
20	Win	13–3–4	Mike Maher	KO	3 (4)	Jul 18, 1902	Olympic A.C., San Francisco, California, US	
19	Win	12–3–4	Al Mejia	PTS	4	Jul 15, 1902	Teutonia Hall, San Francisco, California, US	
18	Win	11–3–4	Mike Maher	KO	4 (4)	Jul 10, 1902	Mechanics' Pavilion Annex, San Francisco, California, US	
17	Win	10–3–4	Mike Maher	PTS	4	Jun 24, 1902	California, US	
16	Loss	9–3–4	Barney Driscoll	MD	4	Jun 17, 1902	Mechanics' Pavilion Annex, San Francisco, California, US	
15	Win	9–2–4	Joe O'Brien	KO	3 (4)	Jun 6, 1902	Mechanics' Pavilion Annex, San Francisco, California, US	
14	Loss	8–2–4	Barney Driscoll	SD	4	May 14, 1902	Olympic A.C., San Francisco, California, US	
13	Win	8–1–4	William Tardelli	TKO	3 (4)	May 13, 1902	Mechanic's Pavilion, San Francisco, California, US	
12	Win	7–1–4	Joe Reilly	PTS	4	May 7, 1902	Mechanics' Pavilion Annex, San Francisco, California, US	
11	Win	6–1–4	William Tardelli	PTS	4	Apr 15, 1902	Mechanics' Pavilion Annex, San Francisco, California, US	
10	Win	5–1–4	Pete Carroll	TKO	? (4)	Apr 3, 1902	Woodward's Pavilion, San Francisco, California, US	
9	Draw	4–1–4	Joe Carroll	PTS	4	Mar 28, 1902	San Francisco A.C., San Francisco, California, US	
8	Win	4–1–3	Pete Carroll	TKO	1 (4)	Mar 19, 1902	Mechanics' Pavilion Annex, San Francisco, California, US	
7	Win	3–1–3	Winnie Dunn	PTS	4	Mar 12, 1902	Mechanics' Pavilion Annex, San Francisco, California, US	
6	Win	2–1–3	Ed Jacobs	PTS	4	Feb 25, 1902	Mechanics' Pavilion Annex, San Francisco, California, US	
5	Win	1–1–3	Young Mitchell	KO	1 (4)	Feb 19, 1902	Mechanics' Pavilion Annex, San Francisco, California, US	
4	Loss	0–1–3	Bobby Johnson	PTS	4	Jan 28, 1902	Mechanics' Pavilion Annex, San Francisco, California, US	
3	Draw	0–0–3	Barney Driscoll	PTS	4	Jan 21, 1902	Mechanics' Pavilion Annex, San Francisco, California, US	
2	Draw	0–0–2	Pete Carroll	PTS	4	Dec 6, 1901	San Francisco A.C., San Francisco, California, US	
1	Draw	0–0–1	Barney Driscoll	PTS	4	Oct 31, 1901	Mechanics' Pavilion Annex, San Francisco, California, US	

== Primary boxing achievements ==
Attell was elected to the International Jewish Sports Hall of Fame in 2015.

Achievements
Vacant Title last held by Jimmy Reagan	World Bantamweight Champion; February 22, 1909 – February 22, 1910	Succeeded by Johnny Coulon

== See also ==
- List of bantamweight boxing champions
- List of select Jewish boxers
