= Willie Ritchie =

American boxing champion (1891–1975)

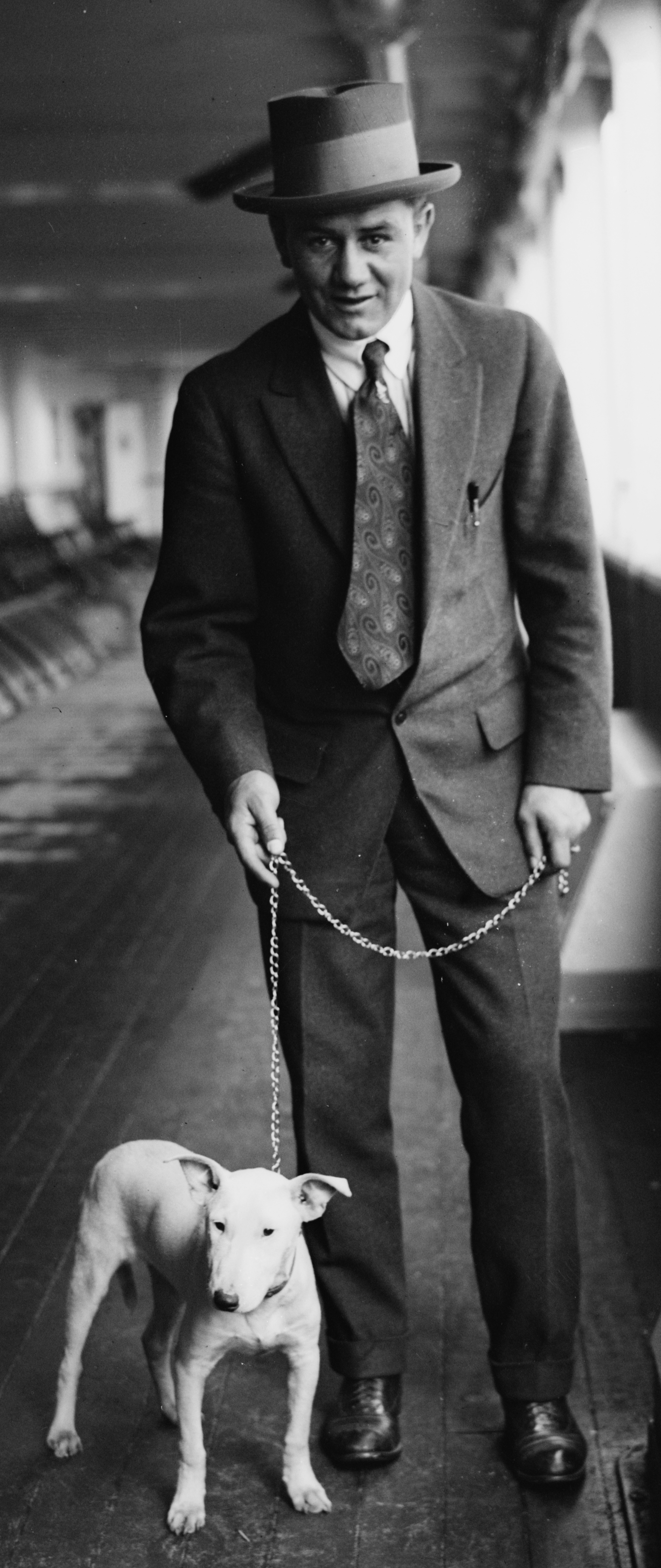

Personal information
- Nickname: Willie
- Nationality: American
- Born: Gerhardt Anthony Steffen; February 13, 1891 San Francisco, California
- Died: March 24, 1975 (aged 84) Burlingame, California
- Height: 5 ft 6.25 in (1.68 m)
- Weight: 115–145 lb

Boxing career
- Reach: 26½″
- Stance: orthodox

Boxing record
- Total fights: 77
- Wins: 45
- Win by KO: 9
- Losses: 14
- Draws: 17
- No contests: 1

Willie Ritchie (born Gerhardt Anthony Steffen, February 13, 1891 – March 24, 1975), was the World lightweight champion from 1912 to 1914.

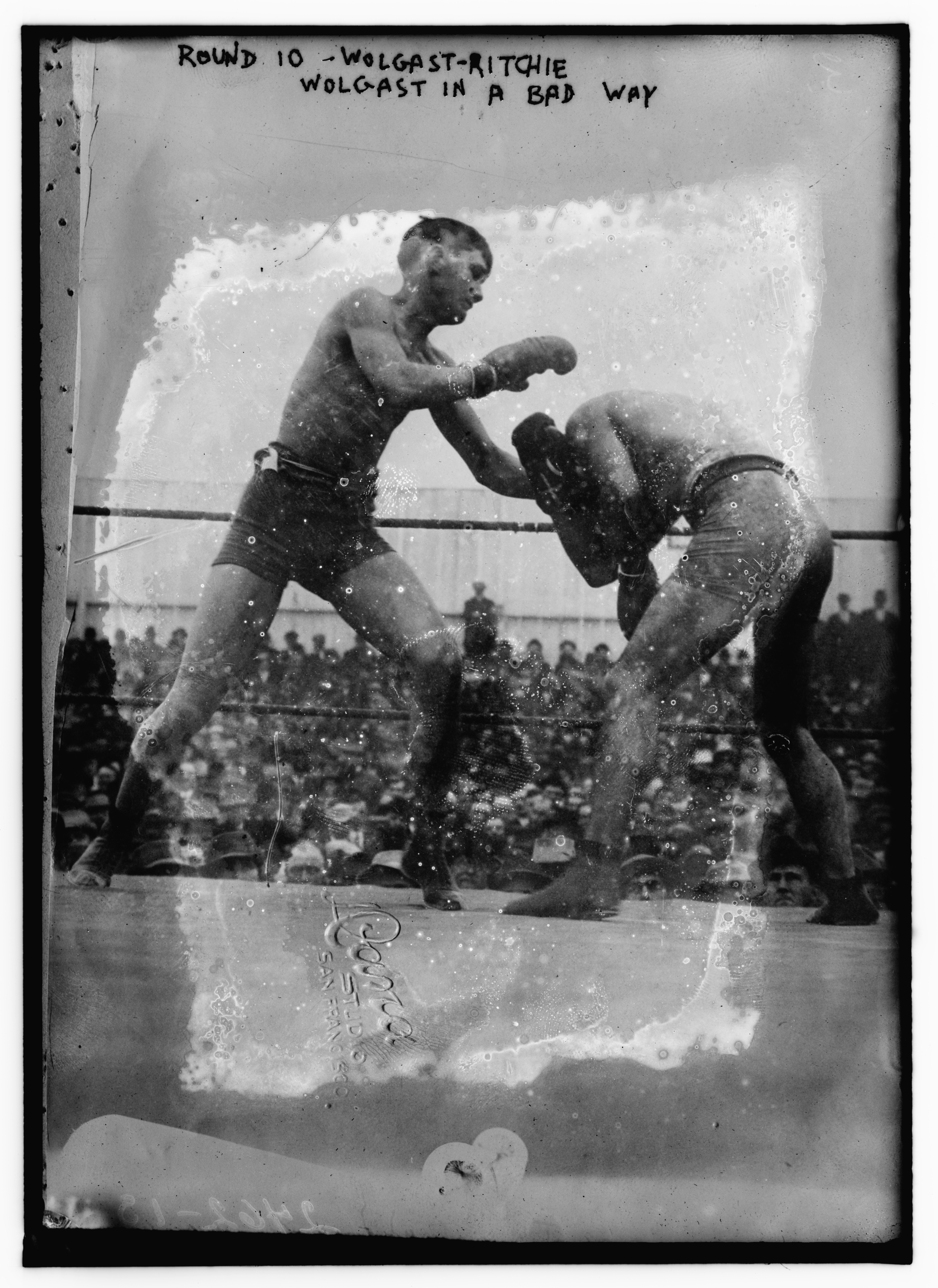
Ritchie (left) in his title fight against Ad Wolgast, 1912.

Gerhardt Anthony Steffen was born in San Francisco, California on February 13, 1891. He began his boxing career in 1907 under the name of "Willie Ritchie" so that his mother would not be aware of his career.

On July 16, 1908, he met future World Bantamweight Champion Jimmy Walsh at the Reliance Athletic Club in Oakland, California, and won a six-round points decision. Ritchie was one of the most accomplished opponents Reagan would meet in his early career.

Ritchie's first title shot was with reigning lightweight champion Ad Wolgast on November 28, 1912, in San Francisco. Ritchie dominated the fight, and after Wolgast landed two blows below the belt in the sixteenth round, the referee called the fight for Ritchie.

He held the title for two years, successfully defending it four times. In 1914, he sailed to London to face the British lightweight champion, Freddie Welsh. Welsh won the 20-round match by decision.

After losing his title, Ritchie continued to fight until retiring in 1927. In 1937, he became chief inspector for the California State Athletic Commission, a position he held until 1961.

Ritchie was a 1962 inductee to The Ring magazine's Boxing Hall of Fame (disbanded in 1987), and a 2004 inductee to the International Boxing Hall of Fame. He died in Burlingame, California, in 1975.

== Professional boxing record ==
All information in this section is derived from BoxRec, unless otherwise stated.

=== Official record ===
77 fights	33 wins	10 losses
By knockout	9	2
By decision	23	8
By disqualification	1	0
Draws	16	
No contests	1	
Newspaper decisions/draws	17	

All newspaper decisions are officially regarded as “no decision” bouts and are not counted in the win/loss/draw column.

No.	Result	Record	Opponent	Type	Round	Date	Location	Notes
77	Win	33–10–16 (18)	Dick Hoppe	PTS	6	Aug 29, 1927	Wrigley Field, Los Angeles, California, U.S.	
76	Win	32–10–16 (18)	Bobby LaSalle	PTS	6	Aug 5, 1927	Legion Stadium, Hollywood, California, U.S.	
75	Win	31–10–16 (18)	Tommy Comiskey	KO	4 (4)	Jun 28, 1927	Golden Gate Arena, San Francisco, California, U.S.	
74	Loss	30–10–16 (18)	Joe Simonich	PTS	4	Aug 20, 1924	Auditorium, Oakland, California, U.S.	
73	Win	30–9–16 (18)	Buck Holley	PTS	4	May 31, 1923	Stockton, California, U.S.	
72	Loss	29–9–16 (18)	Benny Leonard	TKO	8 (8)	Apr 28, 1919	1st Regiment Armory, Newark, New Jersey, U.S.	
71	Win	29–8–16 (18)	Benny Leonard	NWS	4	Feb 21, 1919	Civic Auditorium, San Francisco, California, U.S.	
70	Win	29–8–16 (17)	Frankie Jones	PTS	4	May 10, 1918	Civic Auditorium, San Francisco, California, U.S.	
69	Loss	28–8–16 (17)	Marty Farrell	PTS	4	Oct 10, 1917	Arena, Emeryville, California, U.S.	
68	Win	28–7–16 (17)	Battling Ortega	PTS	4	Sep 10, 1917	Arena, Emeryville, California, U.S.	
67	Win	27–7–16 (17)	Frank Barrieau	PTS	4	Sep 3, 1917	Arena, Emeryville, California, U.S.	
66	Draw	26–7–16 (17)	Frank Barrieau	PTS	4	Aug 22, 1917	Arena, Emeryville, California, U.S.	
65	Win	26–7–15 (17)	Johnny McCarthy	PTS	4	Aug 3, 1917	Dreamland Rink, San Francisco, California, U.S.	
64	Win	25–7–15 (17)	Sid Mitchell	KO	4 (4)	Dec 3, 1916	Dreamland Pavilion, Seattle, Washington, U.S.	
63	Win	24–7–15 (17)	Sid Mitchell	PTS	4	Nov 22, 1916	Dreamland Pavilion, Seattle, Washington, U.S.	
62	Draw	23–7–15 (17)	Johnny McCarthy	PTS	10	Nov 12, 1916	Stone Arena, Ciudad Juarez, Chihuahua, Mexico	
61	Win	23–7–14 (17)	Johnny McCarthy	PTS	10	Oct 12, 1916	Goldfield, Nevada, U.S.	
60	Win	22–7–14 (17)	Willie Hoppe	PTS	4	Aug 11, 1916	Coffroth's Arena, Daly City, California, U.S.	
59	Draw	21–7–14 (17)	Willie Hoppe	PTS	4	Jun 30, 1916	Coffroth's Arena, Daly City, California, U.S.	
58	Win	21–7–13 (17)	Ralph Gruman	NWS	6	Jun 6, 1916	Ice Hippodrome, Portland, Oregon, U.S.	
57	Loss	21–7–13 (16)	Ted Kid Lewis	NWS	10	Dec 28, 1915	Madison Square Garden, New York City, New York, U.S.	World welterweight title at stake; (via KO only)
56	Win	21–7–13 (15)	Eddie McAndrews	NWS	6	Dec 20, 1915	Olympia A.C., Philadelphia, Pennsylvania, U.S.	
55	Win	21–7–13 (14)	Eddie McAndrews	NWS	6	Nov 22, 1915	Olympia A.C., Philadelphia, Pennsylvania, U.S.	
54	Loss	21–7–13 (13)	Johnny Dundee	NWS	10	Oct 26, 1915	Madison Square Garden, New York City, New York, U.S.	
53	Draw	21–7–13 (12)	Matty Baldwin	PTS	12	May 18, 1915	Armory, Boston, Massachusetts, U.S.	
52	Win	21–7–12 (12)	Johnny Griffiths	NWS	6	Apr 9, 1915	Duquesne Garden, Pittsburgh, Pennsylvania, U.S.	
51	Win	21–7–12 (11)	Freddie Welsh	NWS	10	Mar 11, 1915	Madison Square Garden, New York City, New York, U.S.	
50	Draw	21–7–12 (10)	Johnny Dundee	PTS	4	Oct 23, 1914	Coffroth's Arena, Daly City, California, U.S.	
49	Loss	21–7–11 (10)	Freddie Welsh	PTS	20	Jul 7, 1914	Olympia, Kensington, London, England, U.K.	Lost world lightweight title (USA version); First world recognized undisputed lightweight championship
48	Loss	21–6–11 (10)	Charley White	NWS	10	May 26, 1914	Auditorium, Milwaukee, Wisconsin, U.S.	World lightweight title (USA version) at stake; (via KO only)
47	Win	21–6–11 (9)	Harlem Tommy Murphy	PTS	20	Apr 17, 1914	Coffroth's Arena, Daly City, California, U.S.	Retained world lightweight title (USA version)
46	Win	20–6–11 (9)	Ad Wolgast	NWS	10	Mar 12, 1914	Auditorium, Milwaukee, Wisconsin, U.S.	World lightweight title (USA version) at stake; (via KO only)
45	Win	20–6–11 (8)	Leach Cross	NWS	10	Nov 10, 1913	Madison Square Garden, New York City, New York, U.S.	
44	Win	20–6–11 (7)	Mexican Joe Rivers	KO	11 (20)	Jul 4, 1913	Eighth Street Arena, San Francisco, California, U.S.	Retained world lightweight title (USA version)
43	Win	19–6–11 (7)	Ad Wolgast	DQ	16 (20)	Nov 28, 1912	Coffroth's Mission Street Arena, Daly City, California, U.S.	Won world lightweight title (USA version)
42	Draw	18–6–11 (7)	Joe Mandot	NWS	10	Jun 24, 1912	New Orleans A.C., New Orleans, Louisiana, U.S.	
41	Win	18–6–11 (6)	Ad Wolgast	NWS	4	May 11, 1912	Coffroth's Arena, San Francisco, California, U.S.	
40	Draw	18–6–11 (5)	Phil Brock	PTS	10	Feb 22, 1912	Luna Park Arena, Cleveland, Ohio, U.S.	
39	Loss	18–6–10 (5)	Charley Turner	NWS	6	Feb 10, 1912	National A.C., Philadelphia, Pennsylvania, U.S.	
38	Win	18–6–10 (4)	Young Erne	NWS	6	Feb 7, 1912	National A.C., Philadelphia, Pennsylvania, U.S.	
37	Win	18–6–10 (3)	Harry Trendall	NWS	6	Jan 27, 1912	Old City Hall, Pittsburgh, Pennsylvania, U.S.	
36	Win	18–6–10 (2)	Yankee Schwartz	KO	2 (10)	Jan 22, 1912	Cleveland, Ohio, U.S.	
35	Win	17–6–10 (2)	Milburn Saylor	NWS	6	Jan 13, 1912	Old City Hall, Pittsburgh, Pennsylvania, U.S.	
34	Draw	17–6–10 (1)	Paul Köhler	PTS	12	Jan 1, 1912	Cleveland, Ohio, U.S.	
33	Loss	17–6–9 (1)	Freddie Welsh	PTS	20	Nov 30, 1911	Arena, Vernon, California, U.S.	
32	Win	17–5–9 (1)	Jerry Murphy	PTS	4	Nov 17, 1911	Dreamland Rink, San Francisco, California, U.S.	
31	Win	16–5–9 (1)	Jack Britton	PTS	4	Oct 6, 1911	Dreamland Rink, San Francisco, California, U.S.	
30	Draw	15–5–9 (1)	Johnny McCarthy	PTS	10	Sep 20, 1911	Wheelmen's Club, Oakland, California, U.S.	
29	Win	15–5–8 (1)	Tommy McFarland	KO	4 (20)	Sep 16, 1911	Coalinga, California, U.S.	
28	Loss	14–5–8 (1)	Matty Baldwin	PTS	20	Aug 31, 1911	Dreamland Rink, San Francisco, California, U.S.	
27	Draw	14–4–8 (1)	Johnny McCarthy	PTS	4	Aug 11, 1911	Dreamland Rink, San Francisco, California, U.S.	
26	Win	14–4–7 (1)	Charley Reilly	PTS	4	May 5, 1911	Dreamland Rink, San Francisco, California, U.S.	
25	Draw	13–4–7 (1)	Johnny McCarthy	PTS	4	Mar 10, 1911	Dreamland Rink, San Francisco, California, U.S.	
24	Draw	13–4–6 (1)	Charley Reilly	PTS	4	Feb 17, 1911	Dreamland Rink, San Francisco, California, U.S.	
23	Win	13–4–5 (1)	Guy Lee	PTS	4	Dec 9, 1910	Dreamland Rink, San Francisco, California, U.S.	
22	Win	12–4–5 (1)	Abe Label	PTS	4	Dec 2, 1910	Dreamland Rink, San Francisco, California, U.S.	
21	Win	11–4–5 (1)	Abe Label	PTS	4	Nov 18, 1910	Dreamland Rink, San Francisco, California, U.S.	
20	Draw	10–4–5 (1)	Jimmy Fitton	PTS	4	Jun 17, 1910	Dreamland Rink, San Francisco, California, U.S.	
19	Win	10–4–4 (1)	Anton LaGrave	PTS	6	Dec 21, 1909	West Oakland Club, Oakland, California, U.S.	
18	Win	9–4–4 (1)	Kid French	KO	8 (?)	Nov 25, 1909	Marysville, California, U.S.	
17	Loss	8–4–4 (1)	Oakland Frankie Burns	PTS	6	Sep 14, 1909	Piedmont Pavilion, Oakland, California, U.S.	
16	Win	8–3–4 (1)	Jim Ford	PTS	4	Jul 21, 1909	West Oakland Club, Oakland, California, U.S.	
15	Loss	7–3–4 (1)	Charley Reilly	PTS	6	May 21, 1909	West Oakland Club, Oakland, California, U.S.	
14	Win	7–2–4 (1)	Tony Joseph	KO	3 (?)	Apr 22, 1909	Marysville, California, U.S.	
13	NC	6–2–4 (1)	Eddie Menney	NC	6 (6)	Dec 29, 1908	West Oakland Club, Oakland, California, U.S.	
12	Win	6–2–4	Willie O'Neill	PTS	6	Nov 24, 1908	West Oakland Club, Oakland, California, U.S.	
11	Draw	5–2–4	Tommy McCarthy	PTS	4	Sep 25, 1908	West Oakland Club, Oakland, California, U.S.	
10	Draw	5–2–3	Tommy McCarthy	PTS	6	Aug 28, 1908	Reliance A.C., Oakland, California, U.S.	
9	Win	5–2–2	Jimmy Reagan	PTS	6	Jul 16, 1908	Reliance A.C., Oakland, California, U.S.	
8	Win	4–2–2	Alex McDonald	PTS	6	Feb 27, 1908	West Oakland Club, Oakland, California, U.S.	
7	Win	3–2–2	Harry Dell	PTS	4	Feb 5, 1908	West Oakland Club, Oakland, California, U.S.	
6	Draw	2–2–2	Oakland Eddie Murphy	PTS	4	Dec 19, 1907	West Oakland Club, Oakland, California, U.S.	
5	Loss	2–2–1	Jack Davis	PTS	4	Jul 5, 1907	Dreamland Rink, San Francisco, California, U.S.	
4	Draw	2–1–1	Kid Austin	PTS	4	Mar 31, 1907	Dreamland Rink, San Francisco, California, U.S.	
3	Win	2–1	Deacon Jones	KO	3 (?)	Apr 1, 1907	Stockton, California, U.S.	Precise date of bout unknown at this time
2	Win	1–1	Monk Enoch	TKO	2 (4)	Mar 8, 1907	Dreamland Rink, San Francisco, California, U.S.	
1	Loss	0–1	Eddie Steele	KO	1 (?)	Jul 19, 1906	West Oakland Club, Oakland, California, U.S.	

=== Unofficial record ===
77 fights	45 wins	14 losses
By knockout	9	2
By decision	35	12
By disqualification	1	0
Draws	17	
No contests	1	

Record with the inclusion of newspaper decisions in the win/loss/draw column.

No.	Result	Record	Opponent	Type	Round	Date	Location	Notes
77	Win	45–14–17 (1)	Dick Hoppe	PTS	6	Aug 29, 1927	Wrigley Field, Los Angeles, California, U.S.	
76	Win	44–14–17 (1)	Bobby LaSalle	PTS	6	Aug 5, 1927	Legion Stadium, Hollywood, California, U.S.	
75	Win	43–14–17 (1)	Tommy Comiskey	KO	4 (4)	Jun 28, 1927	Golden Gate Arena, San Francisco, California, U.S.	
74	Loss	42–14–17 (1)	Joe Simonich	PTS	4	Aug 20, 1924	Auditorium, Oakland, California, U.S.	
73	Win	42–13–17 (1)	Buck Holley	PTS	4	May 31, 1923	Stockton, California, U.S.	
72	Loss	41–13–17 (1)	Benny Leonard	TKO	8 (8)	Apr 28, 1919	1st Regiment Armory, Newark, New Jersey, U.S.	
71	Win	41–12–17 (1)	Benny Leonard	NWS	4	Feb 21, 1919	Civic Auditorium, San Francisco, California, U.S.	
70	Win	40–12–17 (1)	Frankie Jones	PTS	4	May 10, 1918	Civic Auditorium, San Francisco, California, U.S.	
69	Loss	39–12–17 (1)	Marty Farrell	PTS	4	Oct 10, 1917	Arena, Emeryville, California, U.S.	
68	Win	39–11–17 (1)	Battling Ortega	PTS	4	Sep 10, 1917	Arena, Emeryville, California, U.S.	
67	Win	38–11–17 (1)	Frank Barrieau	PTS	4	Sep 3, 1917	Arena, Emeryville, California, U.S.	
66	Draw	37–11–17 (1)	Frank Barrieau	PTS	4	Aug 22, 1917	Arena, Emeryville, California, U.S.	
65	Win	37–11–16 (1)	Johnny McCarthy	PTS	4	Aug 3, 1917	Dreamland Rink, San Francisco, California, U.S.	
64	Win	36–11–16 (1)	Sid Mitchell	KO	4 (4)	Dec 3, 1916	Dreamland Pavilion, Seattle, Washington, U.S.	
63	Win	35–11–16 (1)	Sid Mitchell	PTS	4	Nov 22, 1916	Dreamland Pavilion, Seattle, Washington, U.S.	
62	Draw	34–11–16 (1)	Johnny McCarthy	PTS	10	Nov 12, 1916	Stone Arena, Ciudad Juarez, Chihuahua, Mexico	
61	Win	34–11–15 (1)	Johnny McCarthy	PTS	10	Oct 12, 1916	Goldfield, Nevada, U.S.	
60	Win	33–11–15 (1)	Willie Hoppe	PTS	4	Aug 11, 1916	Coffroth's Arena, Daly City, California, U.S.	
59	Draw	32–11–15 (1)	Willie Hoppe	PTS	4	Jun 30, 1916	Coffroth's Arena, Daly City, California, U.S.	
58	Win	32–11–14 (1)	Ralph Gruman	NWS	6	Jun 6, 1916	Ice Hippodrome, Portland, Oregon, U.S.	
57	Loss	31–11–14 (1)	Ted Kid Lewis	NWS	10	Dec 28, 1915	Madison Square Garden, New York City, New York, U.S.	World welterweight title at stake; (via KO only)
56	Win	31–10–14 (1)	Eddie McAndrews	NWS	6	Dec 20, 1915	Olympia A.C., Philadelphia, Pennsylvania, U.S.	
55	Win	30–10–14 (1)	Eddie McAndrews	NWS	6	Nov 22, 1915	Olympia A.C., Philadelphia, Pennsylvania, U.S.	
54	Loss	29–10–14 (1)	Johnny Dundee	NWS	10	Oct 26, 1915	Madison Square Garden, New York City, New York, U.S.	
53	Draw	29–9–14 (1)	Matty Baldwin	PTS	12	May 18, 1915	Armory, Boston, Massachusetts, U.S.	
52	Win	29–9–13 (1)	Johnny Griffiths	NWS	6	Apr 9, 1915	Duquesne Garden, Pittsburgh, Pennsylvania, U.S.	
51	Win	28–9–13 (1)	Freddie Welsh	NWS	10	Mar 11, 1915	Madison Square Garden, New York City, New York, U.S.	
50	Draw	27–9–13 (1)	Johnny Dundee	PTS	4	Oct 23, 1914	Coffroth's Arena, Daly City, California, U.S.	
49	Loss	27–9–12 (1)	Freddie Welsh	PTS	20	Jul 7, 1914	Olympia, Kensington, London, England, U.K.	Lost world lightweight title (USA version); First world recognized undisputed lightweight championship
48	Loss	27–8–12 (1)	Charley White	NWS	10	May 26, 1914	Auditorium, Milwaukee, Wisconsin, U.S.	World lightweight title (USA version) at stake; (via KO only)
47	Win	27–7–12 (1)	Harlem Tommy Murphy	PTS	20	Apr 17, 1914	Coffroth's Arena, Daly City, California, U.S.	Retained world lightweight title (USA version)
46	Win	26–7–12 (1)	Ad Wolgast	NWS	10	Mar 12, 1914	Auditorium, Milwaukee, Wisconsin, U.S.	World lightweight title (USA version) at stake; (via KO only)
45	Win	25–7–12 (1)	Leach Cross	NWS	10	Nov 10, 1913	Madison Square Garden, New York City, New York, U.S.	
44	Win	24–7–12 (1)	Mexican Joe Rivers	KO	11 (20)	Jul 4, 1913	Eighth Street Arena, San Francisco, California, U.S.	Retained world lightweight title (USA version)
43	Win	23–7–12 (1)	Ad Wolgast	DQ	16 (20)	Nov 28, 1912	Coffroth's Mission Street Arena, Daly City, California, U.S.	Won world lightweight title (USA version)
42	Draw	22–7–12 (1)	Joe Mandot	NWS	10	Jun 24, 1912	New Orleans A.C., New Orleans, Louisiana, U.S.	
41	Win	22–7–11 (1)	Ad Wolgast	NWS	4	May 11, 1912	Coffroth's Arena, San Francisco, California, U.S.	
40	Draw	21–7–11 (1)	Phil Brock	PTS	10	Feb 22, 1912	Luna Park Arena, Cleveland, Ohio, U.S.	
39	Loss	21–7–10 (1)	Charley Turner	NWS	6	Feb 10, 1912	National A.C., Philadelphia, Pennsylvania, U.S.	
38	Win	21–6–10 (1)	Young Erne	NWS	6	Feb 7, 1912	National A.C., Philadelphia, Pennsylvania, U.S.	
37	Win	20–6–10 (1)	Harry Trendall	NWS	6	Jan 27, 1912	Old City Hall, Pittsburgh, Pennsylvania, U.S.	
36	Win	19–6–10 (1)	Yankee Schwartz	KO	2 (10)	Jan 22, 1912	Cleveland, Ohio, U.S.	
35	Win	18–6–10 (1)	Milburn Saylor	NWS	6	Jan 13, 1912	Old City Hall, Pittsburgh, Pennsylvania, U.S.	
34	Draw	17–6–10 (1)	Paul Köhler	PTS	12	Jan 1, 1912	Cleveland, Ohio, U.S.	
33	Loss	17–6–9 (1)	Freddie Welsh	PTS	20	Nov 30, 1911	Arena, Vernon, California, U.S.	
32	Win	17–5–9 (1)	Jerry Murphy	PTS	4	Nov 17, 1911	Dreamland Rink, San Francisco, California, U.S.	
31	Win	16–5–9 (1)	Jack Britton	PTS	4	Oct 6, 1911	Dreamland Rink, San Francisco, California, U.S.	
30	Draw	15–5–9 (1)	Johnny McCarthy	PTS	10	Sep 20, 1911	Wheelmen's Club, Oakland, California, U.S.	
29	Win	15–5–8 (1)	Tommy McFarland	KO	4 (20)	Sep 16, 1911	Coalinga, California, U.S.	
28	Loss	14–5–8 (1)	Matty Baldwin	PTS	20	Aug 31, 1911	Dreamland Rink, San Francisco, California, U.S.	
27	Draw	14–4–8 (1)	Johnny McCarthy	PTS	4	Aug 11, 1911	Dreamland Rink, San Francisco, California, U.S.	
26	Win	14–4–7 (1)	Charley Reilly	PTS	4	May 5, 1911	Dreamland Rink, San Francisco, California, U.S.	
25	Draw	13–4–7 (1)	Johnny McCarthy	PTS	4	Mar 10, 1911	Dreamland Rink, San Francisco, California, U.S.	
24	Draw	13–4–6 (1)	Charley Reilly	PTS	4	Feb 17, 1911	Dreamland Rink, San Francisco, California, U.S.	
23	Win	13–4–5 (1)	Guy Lee	PTS	4	Dec 9, 1910	Dreamland Rink, San Francisco, California, U.S.	
22	Win	12–4–5 (1)	Abe Label	PTS	4	Dec 2, 1910	Dreamland Rink, San Francisco, California, U.S.	
21	Win	11–4–5 (1)	Abe Label	PTS	4	Nov 18, 1910	Dreamland Rink, San Francisco, California, U.S.	
20	Draw	10–4–5 (1)	Jimmy Fitton	PTS	4	Jun 17, 1910	Dreamland Rink, San Francisco, California, U.S.	
19	Win	10–4–4 (1)	Anton LaGrave	PTS	6	Dec 21, 1909	West Oakland Club, Oakland, California, U.S.	
18	Win	9–4–4 (1)	Kid French	KO	8 (?)	Nov 25, 1909	Marysville, California, U.S.	
17	Loss	8–4–4 (1)	Oakland Frankie Burns	PTS	6	Sep 14, 1909	Piedmont Pavilion, Oakland, California, U.S.	
16	Win	8–3–4 (1)	Jim Ford	PTS	4	Jul 21, 1909	West Oakland Club, Oakland, California, U.S.	
15	Loss	7–3–4 (1)	Charley Reilly	PTS	6	May 21, 1909	West Oakland Club, Oakland, California, U.S.	
14	Win	7–2–4 (1)	Tony Joseph	KO	3 (?)	Apr 22, 1909	Marysville, California, U.S.	
13	NC	6–2–4 (1)	Eddie Menney	NC	6 (6)	Dec 29, 1908	West Oakland Club, Oakland, California, U.S.	
12	Win	6–2–4	Willie O'Neill	PTS	6	Nov 24, 1908	West Oakland Club, Oakland, California, U.S.	
11	Draw	5–2–4	Tommy McCarthy	PTS	4	Sep 25, 1908	West Oakland Club, Oakland, California, U.S.	
10	Draw	5–2–3	Tommy McCarthy	PTS	6	Aug 28, 1908	Reliance A.C., Oakland, California, U.S.	
9	Win	5–2–2	Jimmy Reagan	PTS	6	Jul 16, 1908	Reliance A.C., Oakland, California, U.S.	
8	Win	4–2–2	Alex McDonald	PTS	6	Feb 27, 1908	West Oakland Club, Oakland, California, U.S.	
7	Win	3–2–2	Harry Dell	PTS	4	Feb 5, 1908	West Oakland Club, Oakland, California, U.S.	
6	Draw	2–2–2	Oakland Eddie Murphy	PTS	4	Dec 19, 1907	West Oakland Club, Oakland, California, U.S.	
5	Loss	2–2–1	Jack Davis	PTS	4	Jul 5, 1907	Dreamland Rink, San Francisco, California, U.S.	
4	Draw	2–1–1	Kid Austin	PTS	4	Mar 31, 1907	Dreamland Rink, San Francisco, California, U.S.	
3	Win	2–1	Deacon Jones	KO	3 (?)	Apr 1, 1907	Stockton, California, U.S.	Precise date of bout unknown at this time
2	Win	1–1	Monk Enoch	TKO	2 (4)	Mar 8, 1907	Dreamland Rink, San Francisco, California, U.S.	
1	Loss	0–1	Eddie Steele	KO	1 (?)	Jul 19, 1906	West Oakland Club, Oakland, California, U.S.	

== See also ==
- Lineal championship

Achievements
Preceded by Ad Wolgast	World Lightweight Champion; November 28, 1912 – July 7, 1914	Succeeded by Freddie Welsh
Sporting positions
Preceded by Johnny Coulon	Oldest living world champion October 29, 1973 – March 24, 1975	Succeeded by Jimmy Reagan
