= Raygun (disambiguation) =

A raygun is a science-fiction weapon.

Raygun also may refer to:

- Raygun (band), a British band
- Raygun (album), a 1996 album by the Matthew Good Band
- Ray Gun (magazine), a music magazine published during the 1990s
- Raygun (breakdancer) (Rachael Gunn, born 1987), Australian breakdancer

== See also ==
- Ray Gunn, a 2026 animated film directed by Brad Bird
- Raymond Gunn (1904–1931), lynching victim
- Reagan (disambiguation)
