= Ragan =

Ragan may refer to:

== People ==
- Ragan (surname)
- Ragan Callaway, American plant and community ecologist
- Ragan Fox, American actor
- Ragan Smith (born 2000), American gymnast and current assistant coach

== Place ==
- Ragan, Nebraska

== Media ==
- Ragan (film), a 1968 spy film
- Ragan (Blake), female character in the mythology of William Blake

== See also ==
- Rajan (disambiguation)
- Regan (disambiguation)
- Reagan (disambiguation)
