= Michael Reagan (disambiguation) =

Michael Reagan (1945–2026) was an American radio host and Republican strategist.

Michael Reagan may also refer to:

- Michael D. Reagan, a signatory of the 1964 "The Triple Revolution" open memorandum
- Michael Francis Reagan American cartographer of the 21st century
- Michael Joseph Reagan (born 1954), U.S. federal judge
- Mike Reagan (fl. 2000s–2020s), American composer

== See also ==
- Michael Regan (disambiguation)
