= Jimmy Reagan =

American boxer

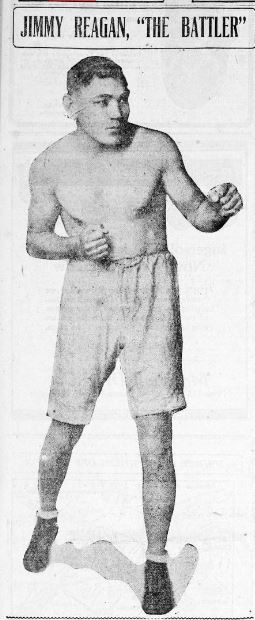

Personal information
- Nicknames: The Battler; Fighting Reagan
- Nationality: American
- Born: James Reagan; C. 1888
- Died: October 1, 1975 (aged 87)
- Height: 5 ft 3 in (1.60 m)
- Weight: Bantamweight; Featherweight

Boxing career
- Stance: Orthodox

Boxing record
- Total fights: 72
- Wins: 25
- Win by KO: 4
- Losses: 31
- Draws: 15
- No contests: 1

Jimmy Reagan (1888–1975) was an American boxer who claimed the World Bantamweight Championship in a twelve-round bout on January 29, 1909 against Jimmy Walsh at Dreamland Rink in San Francisco, California. He lost the title only a month later in an historic twenty round bout on February 22, 1909 to Monte Attell at the Mission Street Arena in San Francisco. Reagan's primary manager was Jack Davis. During his career he fought Battling Nelson, Peanuts Sinclair, future lightweight champion Willie Ritchie, World Feather and Lightweight contender "Mexican Joe" Rivers and reigning lightweight champion Benny Leonard.

== Career before the championship ==
Jimmy Reagan's birthdate is unconfirmed. The Evening standard stated in October 1910 that Reagan was 21 years old. While The Salt Lake Tribune stated he was 23 years old in February 1911. While the papers contradict each other, as Reagan couldn't be 21 in late 1910 and 23 in early 1911, they both leave the possibility of Reagan being born in 1888 making that the most likely birthyear. He was born of both Irish and Italian descent, with his father being Irish, and his mother Italian. He began fighting professionally around late 1907 in the Oakland, California area, and won all but two of his first nine fights in the following year, primarily in short four and six round bouts.

On July 16, 1908, in a rare early career loss he met the gifted Willie Ritchie at the Reliance Athletic Club in Oakland, California, and came up on the short end of a six-round points decision. Ritchie was one of the most accomplished opponents Reagan would meet in his early career and would hold the World Lightweight Title from 1912 to 1914.

He met Monte Attell for the first time on November 30, 1908 in an important fifteen-round draw at the Dreamland Pavilion in Oakland.

== World Bantamweight champion ==
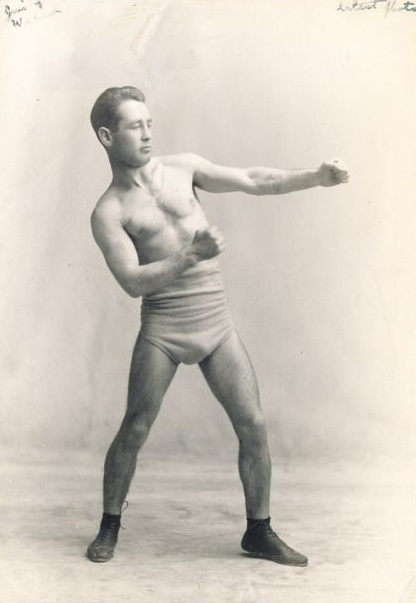
World Bantamweight Champion Jimmy Walsh

On January 29, 1909, Reagan met Jimmy Walsh at the Dreamland Rink in San Francisco for a twelve-round World Bantamweight Title match. According to the Oakland Tribune, "Reagan led in every one of the twelve rounds with Walsh and was entitled to the verdict," though admitting the "title was a very close one."

Joe Woodman, Walsh's manager, admitted that Walsh had been beaten in eight of the twelve rounds, though it was a surprise to much of the audience who believed that Reagan had been overmatched with Walsh in the days before the fight. Walsh was considered to have a more clever boxing form and finesse, particularly in the early rounds, but Reagan was the aggressor, delivering more blows, and taking the initiative in the final rounds. Three days after taking the World Bantamweight Championship, he was signed to appear in a local Vaudeville House at a salary of $250 a week, an impressive sum for the era.

== Loss of Bantamweight Title ==
On February 22, 1909, he lost to Monte Attell in a thrilling twenty round title fight at the Mission Street Arena in San Francisco. In the first six rounds the fighting was quite close, with Attell down four times in the early rounds. Reagan was down twice in the eighth, once for a nine count. Reagan knocked down Attell with a right to the jaw just as the bell sounded ending the sixth round, but Attell recovered, though dazed by the blow. According to the Oakland Tribune, Attell took every round from the eighth through the twentieth.

On August 8, 1909, he finally lost the World Bantamweight Title to the exceptional Attell, brother to World Featherweight Champion Abe, in a fourth of ten-round knockout in Oakland, California only seven months after taking the title. The bout was billed as the 115 pound World Bantamweight championship. Reagan was able to hold his title for only one month. Perhaps if he had the opportunity to meet challengers less skilled and dominant than Monte Attell, he would have held the title far longer, but Attell was a local boxer and would not be denied his chance.

== Bouts after losing bantamweight title ==
On September 5, 1910, he defeated Peanuts Sinclair in a thirteen-round knockout at the Fair Grounds in Ogden, Utah on what was then Labor Day. The fight was billed as an "Inter-Mountain Featherweight Championship", though Sinclair was not a featherweight of great national prominence. He trained at the Hermitage at Ogden Canyon for the well publicized bout, and told the press he would consider retiring if he lost the bout. Sinclair's training at Willard Bean's Gymnasium included pulley work, a form of strength training, shadow boxing, club swinging, and rope dancing. Apparently Reagan was accurate in his belief that he had an edge in the match. A very large crowd was expected to attend the bout. Reagan worked out with the punching bag, skipping rope, medicine ball, and sand bag.

On October 7, 1910, he lost to Gene McGovern in the Fairgrounds in Ogden, Utah, in an eleventh round disqualification. The original call was a knockout by Reagan, but upon closer examination, the Referee Tom Painter ruled that Reagan had hit McGovern below the belt. After consulting with three physicians who examined McGovern, Painter made the binding ruling and awarded the bout to McGovern, reversing the rule of a knockout by Reagan. A crowd of 1500 witnessed the vigorous bout that saw Reagan dominating in every round. McGovern was counted out after he had laid down after the final blow. The bout was to have been for the Inter-Mountain Featherweight Championship.

=== Loss to "Mexican Joe" Rivers ===
On February 22, 1911, he lost to Mexican Joe Rivers by a technical knockout in the thirteenth round of a scheduled twenty. Reagan took a "terrific beating" and was knocked down four times prior to the thirteenth round when he was knocked down twice more by Rivers before the fight was called by Referee Eyeton. The bout took place in the Arena in Vernon, California, considered in the city of Los Angeles. The referee was Charles Eyton. Rivers would contend for the World Lightweight Title on July 4, 1913 against Willie Ritchie. He would fight many of the top feather and lightweight boxers in the country.

He fought Monte Attell again in a draw bout on July 25, 1911, at the Buffalo Athletic Club in Sacramento, California.

He fought "Chalky" Germaine twice, first on January 8, 1912, in what was to be a ten-round bout at the Colonial Theatre in Salt Lake City, Utah. Reagan was having trouble making the 122 pound limit for the bout. Nevertheless, he won the bout in the fifth round on points. Germaine was losing throughout the bout, and was clearly still suffering from a previous illness. Referee Harding K. Downing stopped the bout in the fifth round as a result. He met Germaine again on July 24, 1912 in Price, Utah, in a 20-round draw.

He defeated Tally Johns on September 4, 1912, at the Salt Lake Theatre in Salt Lake City, Utah, in an uncharacteristic fourteenth-round TKO of a twenty-round match. Johns was described by one source as a "featherweight champion of the Northwest." Johns ended the bout with one eye badly swollen and the other entirely shut. Suffering, he had his seconds stop the bout forty-five seconds into the fourteenth round. Reagan was described as the aggressor throughout the bout, but not a single knockdown of either boxer occurred in the fight.

Between October 1913 and February 1915, he fought Sally Salvadore three times, winning in each bout.

On November 5, 1915, he won against the great Battling Nelson in a ten-round points decision in Kansas City, Missouri. Nelson, the former lightweight champion, lost decisively, and took serious punishment.

== Decline of boxing career ==
Between August 1916, and May 1919, he began losing bouts with greater frequency, winning only 1 of 14 of his late career bouts. Though a number of the boxers he met after his loss of the title were competent or even gifted, his boxing dominance was relatively brief for a former World Champion.

=== Match with Benny Leonard ===
Near the end of his boxing career, on February 28, 1917, he fought the exceptional reigning lightweight champion Benny Leonard at the Manhattan Casino in Manhattan, New York, in a ten-round match, that the New York Times considered a draw bout. The Des Moines Register considered the fact that Reagan had gone ten rounds without being knocked out by the extraordinary champion a remarkable accomplishment. According to the Ogden Standard, "Dozens of times Jimmy seemed on the point of going down, but always he kept afoot. The Standard also wrote of Leonard, that "there wasn't a punch that he didn't aim at Reagan, and there wasn't one that was forceful enough to keep the Californian at bay."

=== Loss to Arlos Fanning ===
On November 20, 1917, he lost decisively to Arlos Fanning in a fifteen-round points decision in Joplin, Missouri. Fanning scored a clear knockdown of Reagan in the fourth, and had leads in twelve rounds, while Reagan took only two rounds, with one was a draw. On November 7, 1917, while in St. Louis training for the bout at the Future City Boxing club, Regan was briefly arrested and then released. Several policeman were able to purchase boxing tickets to a boxing event sponsored by the club, without having club membership, which was legally required to purchase tickets. When such violations occurred the boxers present at a club were arrested.

Of his late career loss to Black boxer Willie St. Clair on January 8, 1918, the Ogden Standard accurately predicted "As a fighter Reagan is through, Undoubtedly he is tough and can take a terrific beating, but for real milling his days apparently are over. Willie won the decision by a mile."

He lost to Neal Allison January 15, 1918 at the Waterloo Theatre in Waterloo, Iowa in a ten-round newspaper decision. Reagan was characterized as a boxer who lacked great scientific boxing skills, being rather "a scrapper of the give and take variety, who relied on his ability to "give and take punishment to bring ...victory."

Reagan died in October 1975.

== Professional boxing record ==
All information in this section is derived from BoxRec, unless otherwise stated.

=== Official record ===
74 fights	22 wins	26 losses
By knockout	5	5
By decision	17	19
By disqualification	0	2
Draws	13	
No contests	1	
Newspaper decisions/draws	12	

All newspaper decisions are officially regarded as “no decision” bouts and are not counted in the win/loss/draw column.

No.	Result	Record	Opponent	Type	Round	Date	Location	Notes
74	Win	22–26–13 (13)	Walt Fanning	PTS	10	Nov 26, 1919	Crescent Theater, Eureka, Utah, US	
73	Loss	21–26–13 (13)	Barney Adair	TKO	6 (10)	May 19, 1919	Auditorium, Des Moines, Iowa, US	
72	Loss	21–25–13 (13)	Danny Matthews	PTS	10	May 1, 1919	Elks' Gym, Chanute, Kansas, US	
71	Loss	21–24–13 (13)	Jimmy Hanlon	PTS	10	Feb 28, 1919	Camp Pike, North Little Rock, Arkansas, US	
70	Loss	21–23–13 (13)	Jack Read	PTS	10	Apr 6, 1918	Hot Springs, Arkansas, US	
69	Loss	21–22–13 (13)	Otto Wallace	TKO	11 (15)	Mar 27, 1918	Business Men's A.C., Fort Worth, Texas, US	
68	Loss	21–21–13 (13)	Jimmy Hanlon	PTS	10	Feb 7, 1918	Hot Springs, Arkansas, US	
67	Loss	21–20–13 (13)	Neal Allison	NWS	10	Jan 15, 1918	Waterloo Theatre, Waterloo, Iowa, US	
66	Loss	21–20–13 (12)	Pat Gilbert	PTS	20	Dec 28, 1917	Armory, Ogden, Utah, US	
65	Loss	21–19–13 (12)	Arlos Fanning	NWS	15	Nov 20, 1917	Joplin, Louisiana, US	
64	Loss	21–19–13 (11)	Jimmy Hanlon	PTS	15	Oct 10, 1917	Orleans A.C., New Orleans, Louisiana, US	
63	Draw	21–18–13 (11)	Joe Malone	NWS	10	Jul 13, 1917	New Polo A.C., New York City, New York, US	
62	Win	21–18–13 (10)	George Cohan	NWS	10	Jun 26, 1917	National S.C., Albany, New York, US	
61	Loss	21–18–13 (9)	Barney Adair	NWS	10	Jun 22, 1917	New Polo A.C., New York City, New York, US	
60	Loss	21–18–13 (8)	Benny Leonard	NWS	10	Feb 28, 1917	Manhattan Casino, New York City, New York, US	
59	Loss	21–18–13 (7)	Johnny Lore	NWS	10	Feb 9, 1917	New Polo A.C., New York City, New York, US	
58	Loss	21–18–13 (6)	Harry Carlson	PTS	12	Oct 26, 1916	Unity Cycle Club, Lawrence, Massachusetts, US	
57	Loss	21–17–13 (6)	Chick Simler	NWS	10	Aug 29, 1916	Pioneer S.C., New York City, New York, US	
56	Loss	21–17–13 (5)	Walter Mohr	NWS	10	Aug 12, 1916	Broadway Arena, New York City, New York, US	
55	Win	21–17–13 (4)	Jimmy Barry	KO	8 (?)	Jul 12, 1916	Providence, Rhode Island, US	
54	Loss	20–17–13 (4)	Joe Welling	PTS	15	Jun 6, 1916	Marieville Gardens, North Providence, Rhode Island, US	
53	Win	20–16–13 (4)	Sailor Joe Kelly	NWS	10	Jun 5, 1916	New York City, New York, US	
52	Win	20–16–13 (3)	Johnny Lore	NWS	10	May 16, 1916	Pioneer S.C., New York City, New York, US	
51	Draw	20–16–13 (2)	Harry Pierce	NWS	10	Apr 28, 1916	Vanderbilt A.C., New York City, New York, US	
50	Loss	20–16–13 (1)	Harvey Thorpe	PTS	10	Jan 26, 1916	Academy A.C., Kansas City, Missouri, US	
49	Loss	20–15–13 (1)	Otto Wallace	PTS	10	Dec 27, 1915	Academy A.C., Kansas City, Missouri, US	
48	ND	20–14–13 (1)	Jimmy Hanlon	ND	6	Nov 10, 1915	Location unknown	
47	Win	20–14–13	Battling Nelson	PTS	10	Nov 5, 1915	20th Century A.C., Kansas City, Missouri, US	
46	Loss	19–14–13	Benny Palmer	PTS	8	Sep 27, 1915	Phoenix A.C., Memphis, Tennessee, US	
45	Draw	19–13–13	Harvey Thorpe	PTS	10	Aug 30, 1915	20th Century A.C., Kansas City, Missouri, US	
44	Loss	19–13–12	Joe Flynn	DQ	12 (15)	Jun 25, 1915	Denver, Colorado, US	
43	Loss	19–12–12	Stanley Yoakum	PTS	20	May 18, 1915	Denver, Colorado, US	
42	Draw	19–11–12	Pat Gilbert	PTS	4	Mar 1, 1915	Garrick Theater, Salt Lake City, Utah, US	
41	Win	19–11–11	Solly Salvadore	PTS	4	Feb 8, 1915	Garrick Theater, Salt Lake City, Utah, US	
40	Win	18–11–11	Joe Getz	PTS	15	Jun 19, 1914	Jackson, California, US	
39	Loss	17–11–11	George Mason	PTS	10	Feb 25, 1914	West Oakland Club, Oakland, California, US	
38	Loss	17–10–11	George Mason	PTS	?	Feb 14, 1914	Oakland, California, US	Exact date unknown
37	Win	17–9–11	Henry Hickey	PTS	6	Feb 10, 1914	Wheelmen Club, Oakland, California, US	
36	Win	16–9–11	Solly Salvadore	PTS	10	Jan 1, 1914	Stockton, California, US	
35	Win	15–9–11	Solly Salvadore	PTS	6	Oct 29, 1913	Wheelmen's Club, Oakland, California, US	
34	Loss	14–9–11	Percy Cove	PTS	4	Jan 24, 1913	Dreamland Rink, San Francisco, California, US	
33	Draw	14–8–11	Percy Cove	PTS	4	Sep 27, 1912	Dreamland Rink, San Francisco, California, US	
32	Win	14–8–10	Tally Johns	TKO	14 (?)	Sep 4, 1912	Salt Lake Theater, Salt Lake City, Utah, US	
31	Draw	13–8–10	Chalky Germaine	PTS	20	Jul 24, 1912	Price, Utah, US	
30	Draw	13–8–9	Tally Johns	PTS	6	Feb 12, 1912	Butte, Montana, US	
29	Win	13–8–8	Chalky Germaine	TKO	5 (10)	Jan 8, 1912	Colonial Theater, Salt Lake City, Utah, US	
28	Loss	12–8–8	Louis Hahn	PTS	4	Dec 8, 1911	Dreamland Rink, San Francisco, California, US	
27	Loss	12–7–8	Percy Cove	PTS	20	Oct 30, 1911	Sacramento, California, US	
26	Draw	12–6–8	Monte Attell	PTS	20	Jul 25, 1911	Buffalo A.C., Sacramento, California, US	
25	Draw	12–6–7	Danny Webster	PTS	20	Jun 14, 1911	Ogden, Utah, US	
24	Draw	12–6–6	Danny Webster	PTS	20	Jun 13, 1911	Glenwood Park Saucer Track, Ogden, Utah, US	
23	Loss	12–6–5	Mexican Joe Rivers	TKO	13 (20)	Feb 22, 1911	Arena, Vernon, California, US	
22	Loss	12–5–5	Gene McGovern	DQ	11 (20)	Oct 7, 1910	Fair Grounds, Ogden, Utah, US	
21	Win	12–4–5	Eugene 'Peanuts' Sinclair	KO	13 (20)	Sep 5, 1910	Fair Grounds, Ogden, Utah, US	Won vacant Inter-Mountain featherweight title
20	Draw	11–4–5	Harley 'Kid' Ross	PTS	4	Jul 7, 1910	Salt Lake A.C., Salt Lake City, Utah, US	
19	Loss	11–4–4	Kid Brown	KO	4 (10)	Jun 28, 1910	Lynbrook, New York, US	
18	Win	11–3–4	Eddie Webber	PTS	6	Jun 18, 1910	Auditorium, Salt Lake City, Utah, US	
17	Draw	10–3–4	Young Erlenborn	PTS	6	Jun 6, 1910	Salt Palace Theater, Salt Lake City, Utah, US	
16	Win	10–3–3	Fred Bennett	PTS	10	Mar 15, 1910	Dreamland Rink, San Francisco, California, US	
15	Loss	9–3–3	Monte Attell	KO	4 (10)	Aug 11, 1909	Piedmont Pavilion, Oakland, California, US	For world bantamweight title
14	Win	9–2–3	Fred Bennett	PTS	10	May 25, 1909	Dreamland Pavilion, San Francisco, California, US	
13	Loss	8–2–3	Monte Attell	PTS	20	Feb 22, 1909	Mission Street Arena, San Francisco, California, US	Lost world bantamweight title claim; For Attell's world bantamweight title claim
12	Win	8–1–3	Jimmy Walsh	PTS	12	Jan 29, 1909	Dreamland Rink, San Francisco, California, US	Won world bantamweight title claim
11	Draw	7–1–3	Jimmy Carroll	PTS	6	Dec 18, 1908	Reliance A.C., Oakland, California, US	
10	Draw	7–1–2	Monte Attell	PTS	15	Nov 30, 1908	Dreamland Pavilon, Oakland, California, US	
9	Win	7–1–1	Harry Williams	PTS	6	Nov 17, 1908	Piedmont Pavilion, Oakland, California, US	
8	Win	6–1–1	Eddie Menney	PTS	6	Oct 23, 1908	West Oakland Club, Oakland, California, US	
7	Win	5–1–1	Eddie Carsey	PTS	6	Aug 18, 1908	Coliseum, San Francisco, California, US	
6	Draw	4–1–1	Harry Dell	PTS	6	Aug 14, 1908	Reliance A.C., Oakland, California, US	
5	Loss	4–1	Willie Ritchie	PTS	6	Jul 16, 1908	Reliance A.C., Oakland, California, US	
4	Win	4–0	Jack Lennon	PTS	4	Jun 18, 1908	West Oakland Club, Oakland, California, US	
3	Win	3–0	Lee Johnson	PTS	4	May 28, 1908	West Oakland Club, Oakland, California, US	
2	Win	2–0	Young Lavigne	KO	3 (4)	Feb 18, 1908	Piedmont Pavilion, Oakland, California, US	
1	Win	1–0	Eddie Young	PTS	4	Dec 19, 1907	West Oakland Club, Oakland, California, US	

=== Unofficial record ===
74 fights	25 wins	33 losses
By knockout	5	5
By decision	20	26
By disqualification	0	2
Draws	15	
No contests	1	

Record with the inclusion of newspaper decisions in the win/loss/draw column.

No.	Result	Record	Opponent	Type	Round	Date	Location	Notes
74	Win	25–33–15 (1)	Walt Fanning	PTS	10	Nov 26, 1919	Crescent Theater, Eureka, Utah, US	
73	Loss	24–33–15 (1)	Barney Adair	TKO	6 (10)	May 19, 1919	Auditorium, Des Moines, Iowa, US	
72	Loss	24–32–15 (1)	Danny Matthews	PTS	10	May 1, 1919	Elks' Gym, Chanute, Kansas, US	
71	Loss	24–31–15 (1)	Jimmy Hanlon	PTS	10	Feb 28, 1919	Camp Pike, North Little Rock, Arkansas, US	
70	Loss	24–30–15 (1)	Jack Read	PTS	10	Apr 6, 1918	Hot Springs, Arkansas, US	
69	Loss	24–29–15 (1)	Otto Wallace	TKO	11 (15)	Mar 27, 1918	Business Men's A.C., Fort Worth, Texas, US	
68	Loss	24–28–15 (1)	Jimmy Hanlon	PTS	10	Feb 7, 1918	Hot Springs, Arkansas, US	
67	Loss	24–27–15 (1)	Neal Allison	NWS	10	Jan 15, 1918	Waterloo Theatre, Waterloo, Iowa, US	
66	Loss	24–26–15 (1)	Pat Gilbert	PTS	20	Dec 28, 1917	Armory, Ogden, Utah, US	
65	Loss	24–25–15 (1)	Arlos Fanning	NWS	15	Nov 20, 1917	Joplin, Louisiana, US	
64	Loss	24–24–15 (1)	Jimmy Hanlon	PTS	15	Oct 10, 1917	Orleans A.C., New Orleans, Louisiana, US	
63	Draw	24–23–15 (1)	Joe Malone	NWS	10	Jul 13, 1917	New Polo A.C., New York City, New York, US	
62	Win	24–23–14 (1)	George Cohan	NWS	10	Jun 26, 1917	National S.C., Albany, New York, US	
61	Loss	23–23–14 (1)	Barney Adair	NWS	10	Jun 22, 1917	New Polo A.C., New York City, New York, US	
60	Loss	23–22–14 (1)	Benny Leonard	NWS	10	Feb 28, 1917	Manhattan Casino, New York City, New York, US	
59	Loss	23–21–14 (1)	Johnny Lore	NWS	10	Feb 9, 1917	New Polo A.C., New York City, New York, US	
58	Loss	23–20–14 (1)	Harry Carlson	PTS	12	Oct 26, 1916	Unity Cycle Club, Lawrence, Massachusetts, US	
57	Loss	23–19–14 (1)	Chick Simler	NWS	10	Aug 29, 1916	Pioneer S.C., New York City, New York, US	
56	Loss	23–18–14 (1)	Walter Mohr	NWS	10	Aug 12, 1916	Broadway Arena, New York City, New York, US	
55	Win	23–17–14 (1)	Jimmy Barry	KO	8 (?)	Jul 12, 1916	Providence, Rhode Island, US	
54	Loss	22–17–14 (1)	Joe Welling	PTS	15	Jun 6, 1916	Marieville Gardens, North Providence, Rhode Island, US	
53	Win	22–16–14 (1)	Sailor Joe Kelly	NWS	10	Jun 5, 1916	New York City, New York, US	
52	Win	21–16–14 (1)	Johnny Lore	NWS	10	May 16, 1916	Pioneer S.C., New York City, New York, US	
51	Draw	20–16–14 (1)	Harry Pierce	NWS	10	Apr 28, 1916	Vanderbilt A.C., New York City, New York, US	
50	Loss	20–16–13 (1)	Harvey Thorpe	PTS	10	Jan 26, 1916	Academy A.C., Kansas City, Missouri, US	
49	Loss	20–15–13 (1)	Otto Wallace	PTS	10	Dec 27, 1915	Academy A.C., Kansas City, Missouri, US	
48	ND	20–14–13 (1)	Jimmy Hanlon	ND	6	Nov 10, 1915	Location unknown	
47	Win	20–14–13	Battling Nelson	PTS	10	Nov 5, 1915	20th Century A.C., Kansas City, Missouri, US	
46	Loss	19–14–13	Benny Palmer	PTS	8	Sep 27, 1915	Phoenix A.C., Memphis, Tennessee, US	
45	Draw	19–13–13	Harvey Thorpe	PTS	10	Aug 30, 1915	20th Century A.C., Kansas City, Missouri, US	
44	Loss	19–13–12	Joe Flynn	DQ	12 (15)	Jun 25, 1915	Denver, Colorado, US	
43	Loss	19–12–12	Stanley Yoakum	PTS	20	May 18, 1915	Denver, Colorado, US	
42	Draw	19–11–12	Pat Gilbert	PTS	4	Mar 1, 1915	Garrick Theater, Salt Lake City, Utah, US	
41	Win	19–11–11	Solly Salvadore	PTS	4	Feb 8, 1915	Garrick Theater, Salt Lake City, Utah, US	
40	Win	18–11–11	Joe Getz	PTS	15	Jun 19, 1914	Jackson, California, US	
39	Loss	17–11–11	George Mason	PTS	10	Feb 25, 1914	West Oakland Club, Oakland, California, US	
38	Loss	17–10–11	George Mason	PTS	?	Feb 14, 1914	Oakland, California, US	Exact date unknown
37	Win	17–9–11	Henry Hickey	PTS	6	Feb 10, 1914	Wheelmen Club, Oakland, California, US	
36	Win	16–9–11	Solly Salvadore	PTS	10	Jan 1, 1914	Stockton, California, US	
35	Win	15–9–11	Solly Salvadore	PTS	6	Oct 29, 1913	Wheelmen's Club, Oakland, California, US	
34	Loss	14–9–11	Percy Cove	PTS	4	Jan 24, 1913	Dreamland Rink, San Francisco, California, US	
33	Draw	14–8–11	Percy Cove	PTS	4	Sep 27, 1912	Dreamland Rink, San Francisco, California, US	
32	Win	14–8–10	Tally Johns	TKO	14 (?)	Sep 4, 1912	Salt Lake Theater, Salt Lake City, Utah, US	
31	Draw	13–8–10	Chalky Germaine	PTS	20	Jul 24, 1912	Price, Utah, US	
30	Draw	13–8–9	Tally Johns	PTS	6	Feb 12, 1912	Butte, Montana, US	
29	Win	13–8–8	Chalky Germaine	TKO	5 (10)	Jan 8, 1912	Colonial Theater, Salt Lake City, Utah, US	
28	Loss	12–8–8	Louis Hahn	PTS	4	Dec 8, 1911	Dreamland Rink, San Francisco, California, US	
27	Loss	12–7–8	Percy Cove	PTS	20	Oct 30, 1911	Sacramento, California, US	
26	Draw	12–6–8	Monte Attell	PTS	20	Jul 25, 1911	Buffalo A.C., Sacramento, California, US	
25	Draw	12–6–7	Danny Webster	PTS	20	Jun 14, 1911	Ogden, Utah, US	
24	Draw	12–6–6	Danny Webster	PTS	20	Jun 13, 1911	Glenwood Park Saucer Track, Ogden, Utah, US	
23	Loss	12–6–5	Mexican Joe Rivers	TKO	13 (20)	Feb 22, 1911	Arena, Vernon, California, US	
22	Loss	12–5–5	Gene McGovern	DQ	11 (20)	Oct 7, 1910	Fair Grounds, Ogden, Utah, US	
21	Win	12–4–5	Eugene 'Peanuts' Sinclair	KO	13 (20)	Sep 5, 1910	Fair Grounds, Ogden, Utah, US	Won vacant Inter-Mountain featherweight title
20	Draw	11–4–5	Harley 'Kid' Ross	PTS	4	Jul 7, 1910	Salt Lake A.C., Salt Lake City, Utah, US	
19	Loss	11–4–4	Kid Brown	KO	4 (10)	Jun 28, 1910	Lynbrook, New York, US	
18	Win	11–3–4	Eddie Webber	PTS	6	Jun 18, 1910	Auditorium, Salt Lake City, Utah, US	
17	Draw	10–3–4	Young Erlenborn	PTS	6	Jun 6, 1910	Salt Palace Theater, Salt Lake City, Utah, US	
16	Win	10–3–3	Fred Bennett	PTS	10	Mar 15, 1910	Dreamland Rink, San Francisco, California, US	
15	Loss	9–3–3	Monte Attell	KO	4 (10)	Aug 11, 1909	Piedmont Pavilion, Oakland, California, US	For world bantamweight title
14	Win	9–2–3	Fred Bennett	PTS	10	May 25, 1909	Dreamland Pavilion, San Francisco, California, US	
13	Loss	8–2–3	Monte Attell	PTS	20	Feb 22, 1909	Mission Street Arena, San Francisco, California, US	Lost world bantamweight title claim; For Attell's world bantamweight title claim
12	Win	8–1–3	Jimmy Walsh	PTS	12	Jan 29, 1909	Dreamland Rink, San Francisco, California, US	Won world bantamweight title claim
11	Draw	7–1–3	Jimmy Carroll	PTS	6	Dec 18, 1908	Reliance A.C., Oakland, California, US	
10	Draw	7–1–2	Monte Attell	PTS	15	Nov 30, 1908	Dreamland Pavilon, Oakland, California, US	
9	Win	7–1–1	Harry Williams	PTS	6	Nov 17, 1908	Piedmont Pavilion, Oakland, California, US	
8	Win	6–1–1	Eddie Menney	PTS	6	Oct 23, 1908	West Oakland Club, Oakland, California, US	
7	Win	5–1–1	Eddie Carsey	PTS	6	Aug 18, 1908	Coliseum, San Francisco, California, US	
6	Draw	4–1–1	Harry Dell	PTS	6	Aug 14, 1908	Reliance A.C., Oakland, California, US	
5	Loss	4–1	Willie Ritchie	PTS	6	Jul 16, 1908	Reliance A.C., Oakland, California, US	
4	Win	4–0	Jack Lennon	PTS	4	Jun 18, 1908	West Oakland Club, Oakland, California, US	
3	Win	3–0	Lee Johnson	PTS	4	May 28, 1908	West Oakland Club, Oakland, California, US	
2	Win	2–0	Young Lavigne	KO	3 (4)	Feb 18, 1908	Piedmont Pavilion, Oakland, California, US	
1	Win	1–0	Eddie Young	PTS	4	Dec 19, 1907	West Oakland Club, Oakland, California, US	

== See also ==
- List of bantamweight boxing champions

Achievements
Preceded by Jimmy Walsh	World Bantamweight Champion; January 29, 1909 – February 22, 1909	Succeeded by Monte Attell
Sporting positions
Preceded by Willie Ritchie	Oldest living world champion March 24 – October 10, 1975	Succeeded by Johnny Wilson
