= Bill Regan =

Bill Regan may refer to:

- Bill Regan (baseball) (1899–1968), American professional baseball second baseman
- Bill Regan (ice hockey) (1908–1995), Canadian professional ice hockey player
- Bill Regan (footballer) (1873–1934), English professional football left winger
