= Regan (disambiguation) =

Regan is a surname of Irish origin.

Regan may also refer to:

- Regan (given name)
- Regan, North Dakota, United States, a city
- Mount Regan (British Columbia), Canada
- Mount Regan (Idaho), United States
- Regan Garden, a historical building in Changning, Shanghai, China

== See also ==
- Reagan (disambiguation)
