= Patrick Regan =

Patrick Regan may refer to:

- Patrick M. Regan (born 1956), American professor at Binghamton University
- Patrick Regan (Medal of Honor, 1918) (1882–1943), United States Army officer and World War I Medal of Honor recipient
- Patrick Regan (Medal of Honor, 1873) (1852–?), United States Navy sailor and peacetime Medal of Honor recipient

== See also ==
- Pat Regan (1955–2008), British anti-gun activist
