= James Regan =

James Regan may refer to:

- James Regan (cricketer) (born 1994), English cricketer
- Jim Regan (rugby), Welsh rugby union and rugby league footballer 1930s
- James Regan (hurler) (born 1991), Irish hurler
- James Regan (politician) (1835–1927), Ontario farmer, merchant and politician
- Jimmy Regan, character in Man's Woman, played by Edward Kimball
