= Mike Regan =

Mike or Michael Regan may refer to:

- Mike Regan (baseball) (1887–1961), American Major League Baseball pitcher
- Mike Regan (lacrosse) (born 1978), American retired lacrosse player
- Mike Regan (politician) (born 1961), American politician in Pennsylvania
- Michael Regan (British Army officer) (born 1942), British Army officer
- Michael Regan (Australian politician) (born 1974), Australian politician
- Michael S. Regan (born 1976), American government official

== See also ==
- Michael Reagan (disambiguation)
- Michael Regin, Indian professional footballer
