= Reagan (surname) =

The family name Reagan, and its cognates Regan, O'Regan, O Regan, O'Reagan, is an Anglicized form of the Irish surname Ó Riagáin or Ó Ríogáin, from Ua Riagáin. The meaning is likely to originate in ancient Gaelic from ri "sovereign, king" and the diminutive -in, "the king's child", transliterating as "little king"

The feminine forename Regan is likely to have derived sometime later from the English royal name Regina.

Notable people with the surname include:

- Jimmy Reagan (1888–1975), American boxer who won the World Bantamweight Championship.
- Ronald Reagan (1911–2004), 40th president of the United States
- Nancy Reagan (1921–2016), wife of Ronald Reagan and First Lady from 1981 to 1989
  - Maureen Reagan (1941–2001), President Reagan's daughter from his first marriage to Jane Wyman
  - Michael Reagan (1945–2026), President Reagan's adopted son and radio talk show host
  - Patricia Ann Reagan (born 1952), better known as Patti Davis, Ronald and Nancy Reagan's daughter
  - Ron Reagan (born 1958), President Reagan's son and journalist
- Frank Reagan (1919–1972), American football player
- John Henninger Reagan (1818–1905), Confederate politician
- Johnny Reagan (1926–2018), American college baseball coach
- Lisa Reagan, American singer
- Marc Reagan, NASA Station Training Lead and NEEMO underwater program Mission Director
- Michael Joseph Reagan (born 1954), American judge
- Michele Reagan (born 1969), Secretary of State of Arizona
- Ron Reagan (Florida politician) (born 1954), American politician
