= Brian Regan =

Brian Regan may refer to:

- Brian Regan (comedian) (born 1958), American stand-up comedian
- Brian Regan (actor) (born 1957), British actor
- Brian Patrick Regan (born 1962), American intelligence officer
- Brian Regan (writer), American screenwriter
