= Reagan (disambiguation) =

Ronald Reagan (1911–2004) was the 40th president of the United States from 1981 to 1989.

Reagan may also refer to:

== Places in the United States ==
- Reagan, Oklahoma, a census-designated place
- Reagan, Henderson County, Tennessee, an unincorporated community
- Reagan, McMinn County, Tennessee, an unincorporated community
- Reagan, Texas, an unincorporated community
- Reagan County, Texas

== Names ==
- Reagan (given name), a given name
- Reagan (surname), a surname

== Media ==
- Reagan (2011 film), an American documentary film
- Reagan (2024 film), an American biographical drama film
- Reagan (2024 book), an American biographical book
- Reagan (EP), an EP by Whirlwind Heat
- "Reagan" (song), track from Killer Mike's album R.A.P. Music (2012)

== See also ==
- Emperor Reigen
- Reigen, a spin-off series in the manga franchise Mob Psycho 100
- List of things named after Ronald Reagan
- Raygun (disambiguation)
- The Reagan Diaries, an edited version of diaries written by Ronald Reagan
- Ragan
- Regan (disambiguation)
- O'Regan
- Ronald Reagan (disambiguation)
