= Regan Tamihere =

- Full name: Regan Brett Tamihere
- Born: 17 April 1984 (age 42)
- Height: 186 cm (6 ft 1 in)
- Weight: 96 kg (212 lb)
- School: Papatoetoe High School
- Notable relative: John Tamihere (uncle)

Rugby union career
- Position: Flanker
Provincial / State sides
Years	Team	Apps	(Points)
2005–06	North Harbour	15	(5)
2011	Otago	5	(0)
Super Rugby
Years	Team	Apps	(Points)
2006	Blues	1	(0)

Regan Brett Tamihere (born 17 April 1984) is a New Zealand former professional rugby union player.

Raised in Auckland, Tamihere is a nephew of former NZ Labour member of parliament John Tamihere. Another uncle, David Wayne Tamihere, was convicted of the murder of Swedish backpackers Urban Höglin and Heidi Paakkonen in a high-profile case. He was educated at Papatoetoe High School in southeast Auckland.

Tamihere, a flanker, debuted for North Harbour in 2005 and the following year was a member their historic Ranfurly Shield-winning team. He made a Blues appearance off the bench against the NSW Waratahs in Sydney during the 2006 Super 14 season. Although contracted by the Blues for 2007, Tamihere was informed by incoming coach Wayne Pivac that he wouldn't be called upon, so made the decision to walk away from rugby and join the police.

Based in Otahuhu, Tamihere remained involved in rugby with the Counties Manukau Police team and took leave in 2011 to play a provincial season for Otago. He rose to the position of Māori Responsiveness Manager for the Counties Manukau police district. In 2023, Tamihere resigned from the police, having been found to have breached COVID-19 restrictions when in 2021 he took a group of people across the Auckland border in his unmarked police car, to attend a tangi.
