= Ron Reagan (Florida politician) =

American politician

Ronald Reagan
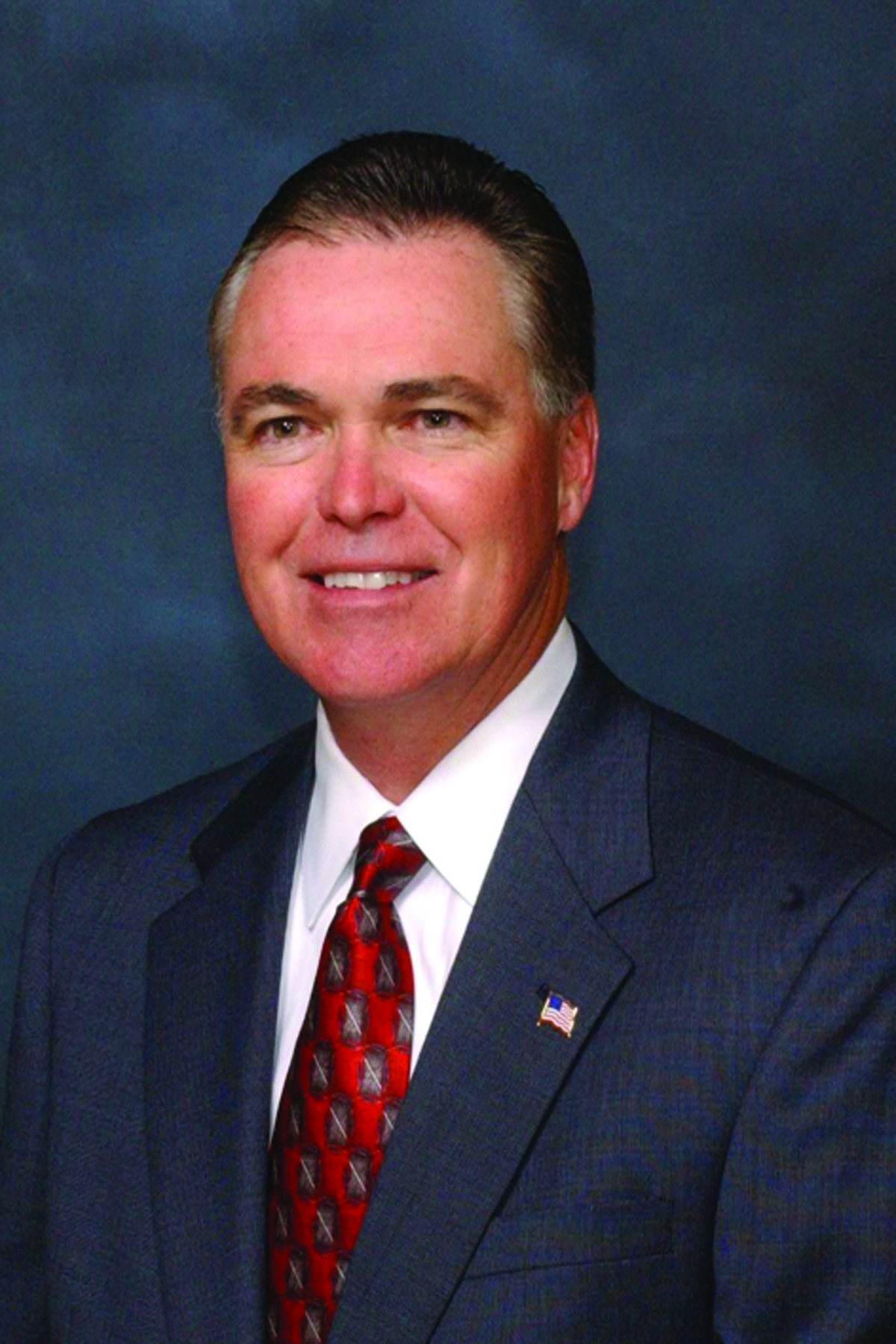

Speaker Pro Tempore of the Florida House of Representatives
- In office March 3, 2009 – November 16, 2010
- Preceded by: Larry Cretul
- Succeeded by: John Legg

Member of the Florida House of Representatives from the 67th district
- In office November 5, 2002 – November 2, 2010
- Preceded by: Mike Bennett
- Succeeded by: Greg Steube

Personal details
- Born: Ronald Reagan; July 11, 1954 (age 72) Norfolk, Virginia
- Party: Republican
- Spouse: Lynn Corsi
- Occupation: Insurance agent, politician
- Profession: Marketing Executive

Ronald Reagan (born July 11, 1954) is a Bradenton, Florida insurance agent and Republican politician who served as the representative for District 67 in the House of Representatives of the U.S. state of Florida. He was first elected in 2002 and was re-elected to three successive terms. He was the majority whip. He chaired the Committee on Insurance and the Jobs & Entrepreneurship Council. He was termed-out in 2010.

== Early life ==
Reagan was born in Norfolk, Virginia on July 11, 1954, and moved to Florida in 1973. He received his Associate of Arts degree from Manatee Community College. In 1977, he attended the University of South Florida. Reagan was also initiated as a member of Tau Kappa Epsilon fraternity at the University of Georgia.

== Florida House of Representatives ==
In 2002, after winning the primary with 69% of the vote, he defeated a Libertarian and a write-in candidate, running on a platform of local control for education and growth issues. In 2004, he won re-election unopposed.

Since leaving the Florida legislature, Reagan has been the Director of National Advocacy and Outreach for the National Coalition for Safer Roads (NCSR), a Texas nonprofit supported by American Traffic Solutions of Scottsdale, Arizona, a manufacturer and operator of red light camera systems.

== Sources ==
- Florida House of Representatives Profile
- Project Vote Smart profile
