= Ragan (surname) =

Ragan is a surname. Notable people with the surname include:

- Chuck Ragan, musician
- Dave Ragan, professional golfer
- David Ragan (born 1985), American stock car racer
- Emily Lee Sherwood Ragan (1839–1916), American author, journalist
- George Ragan (born 1981/82), better known by his stage name "Johnny 3 Tears", American musician
- Ken Ragan, stock car racer and father of David
- Sam Ragan, journalist, author, poet
