= Thomas J. McCarey =

American boxing promoter (1878–1936)

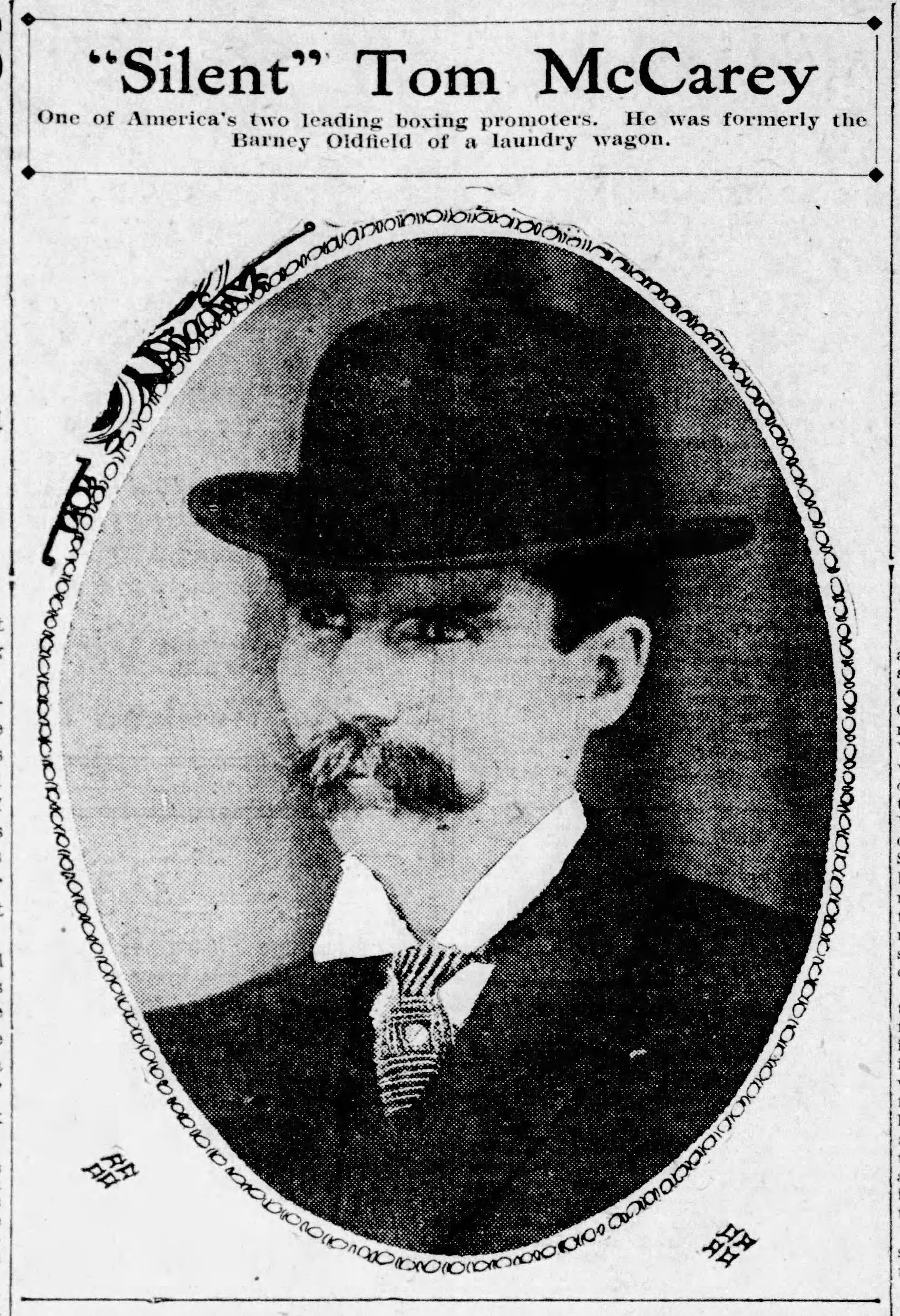
- Tom McCarey, 1913
- Born: September 22, 1872; Illinois, U.S.
- Died: January 31, 1936 (aged 63); St. Vincent's Hospital, Los Angeles, California, U.S.
- Other names: T. J. McCarey, Uncle Tom, Silent Tom
- Occupation: Boxing promoter
- Years active: 1896–1914

Thomas J. "Uncle Tom" McCarey (September 22, 1872 – January 31, 1936) was an American boxing promoter working in California who organized fights at Hazard Pavilion, Naud Junction, and Vernon Arena.

== History ==
McCarey came to California in 1896 and was one of the two major boxing promoters in the state, along with "Sunny Jim" Coffroth. McCarey's office was at "107 Spring street in Al Greenwald's cigar store". One famous fight he organized was the Joe Rivers–Ad Wolgast bout of 1912. With the passage of California Proposition 20 in 1914, which banned professional boxing in the state, McCarey relocated to New Orleans. His last fight had been a 20-round match between Joe Rivers and Johnny Dundee; he did not return to the sport even when boxing was relegalized in 1924.

According to his obituary in the Los Angeles Times, McCarey "never wavered from his belief that Jack Johnson was the greatest fighter who ever lived." His sons Leo McCarey and Ray McCarey were notable Hollywood directors.
