= Michigan Wildcat =

Michigan Wildcat may refer to:

- Northern Michigan Wildcats, of Northern Michigan University
- Ad Wolgast, boxer known as the Michigan Wildcat
