= Joe Mandot =

American boxer

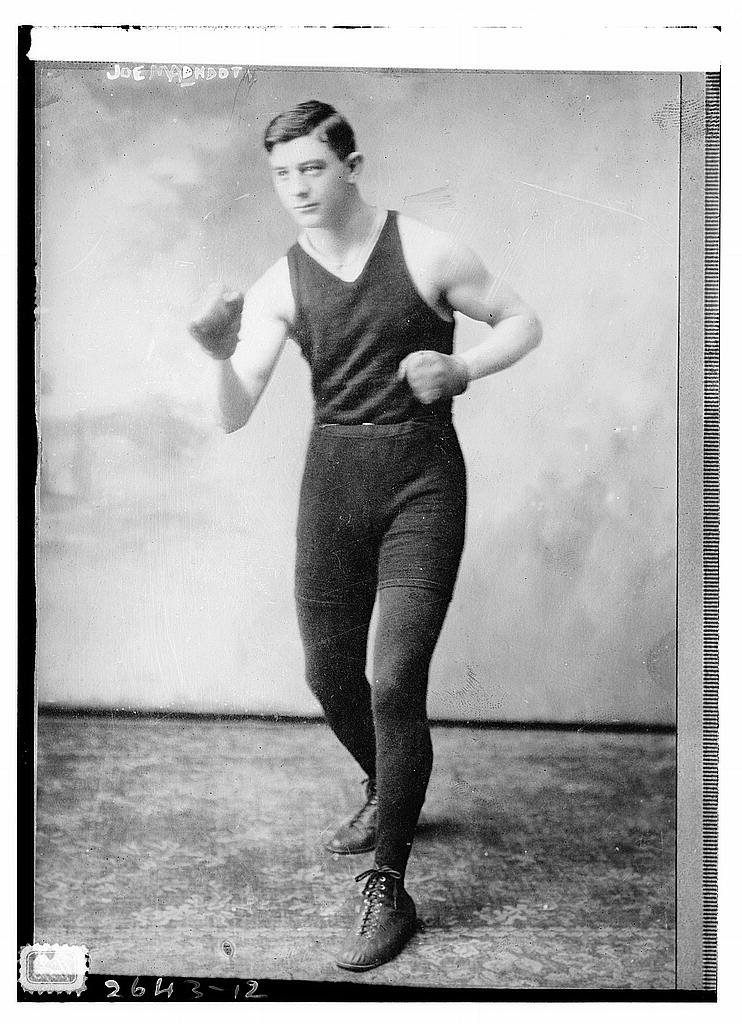

Personal information
- Nickname: Baker Boy
- Nationality: (United States) American
- Born: Joseph Marceline Mandot; August 3, 1889 New Orleans, Louisiana
- Died: July 29, 1956 (aged 66); Exact date of death unknown New Orleans, Louisiana
- Height: 5 ft 6 in (1.68 m)
- Weight: Lightweight

Boxing career

Boxing record
- Total fights: 82
- Wins: 52
- Win by KO: 13
- Losses: 18
- Draws: 12
- No contests: 2

Joseph Marceline Mandot (August 3, 1889 – July 29, 1956) also known as Baker Boy, was a young featherweight boxer and an accomplished contender for both the world lightweight championship in 1912 and the world welterweight championship in 1915. He fought five world champions in the WWI boxing era, defeating or giving close bouts to each. He was managed in his early career by Billy Walsh, and for a time by Blacky Raggio.

== Early life and career ==
He was born on August 3, 1889, in New Orleans, and worked for a period as a baker prior to his boxing career. His father owned a bakery in the New Orleans' French quarter, and his brother worked as a baker as well.

Turning professional around April 1909, in September of that year, he competed for the Southern Bantamweight title in Atlanta, Georgia, drawing with George Kitson in a ten round decision.

Future world lightweight champion Charley White fell to Mandot in an eight round points decision at Memphis's Southern Athletic Club on April 17, 1911. Mandot knocked White to the canvas in both the second and seventh rounds. White appeared too battered to finish in the seventh, but fought gamely on, taking the lead in the fighting in the eighth.

Mandot defeated former Canadian lightweight champion Billy Allen on January 18, 1912, decisively in an eight round points decision in Memphis. Allen was floored seven times, and was badly punished in the fifth, sixth, and seventh rounds, dispensing staggering swings to the head and body.

Mandot defeated Philadelphia Pal Moore on February 20, 1912, in a ten round points decision in New Orleans. It was the consensus of most sports writers that Mandot had clearly won five rounds, with Moore three, and two even. It was in the tenth that Mandot assured his victory with telling blows to the face of Moore. Mandot marked the Philadelphia boxer's face and nearly closed his left eye. Moore still fought aggressively, particularly in the seventh and eighth, and carried the fighting in the first six rounds as well. In the opinion of one reporter, Mandot landed more blows in all but the first, second, and possibly eighth rounds, but the bout was close, and particularly fierce in the final round. He scored more often in the infighting and landed frequently to Mandot's midsection.

Mandot won an eight round points decision with Owen Moran on April 1, 1912. Mandot was down for a long count in the second, but carried the fight to the Englishman for the remainder of the match, scoring a comfortable lead in points by the eighth. Mandot forced the fight after the second round with little or no counterpunching from Moran.

On June 24, 1912, Mandot drew with future holder of the world lightweight championship, Willie Ritchie, in a ten round newspaper decision in New Orleans. In a close bout, The Washington Post wrote that Ritchie was close to knocking out Mandot in the tenth round. New Orleans' Times Democrat wrote that Ritchie had the lead in the last three rounds, and since Mandot was down twice in the tenth, Ritchie deserved the decision. The New Orleans Daily Picayune, however wrote that Mandot had a solid lead going into the ninth, and that Ritchie's performance in the tenth merited only a draw, though the referee, who was satisfied with the draw ruling, believed Mandot still held a slight lead after the tenth.

Mandot defeated Mexican Joe Rivers on September 2, 1912, in a twenty round points decision at the Arena in Vernon, California. The New York Daily wrote that Mandot had the better of all but three rounds and won the decision by a wide margin. He penetrated Rivers's defense, landing straight lefts almost continuously. In the eighth, he began rocking Rivers' head with right and left swings, and in the remaining rounds he followed this attack. Rivers appeared to have won the fourth, sixth, and eleventh by a slight margin. Rivers contended unsuccessfully for the American version of the world lightweight title in 1913. He would lose to Rivers on November 28, 1912, in a twenty round points decision at the Arena in Vernon. The fighting was fast and fierce, but Rivers appeared to win decisively, landed more frequent and telling blows and taking the lead in most of the rounds.

=== Contending for the world lightweight title ===
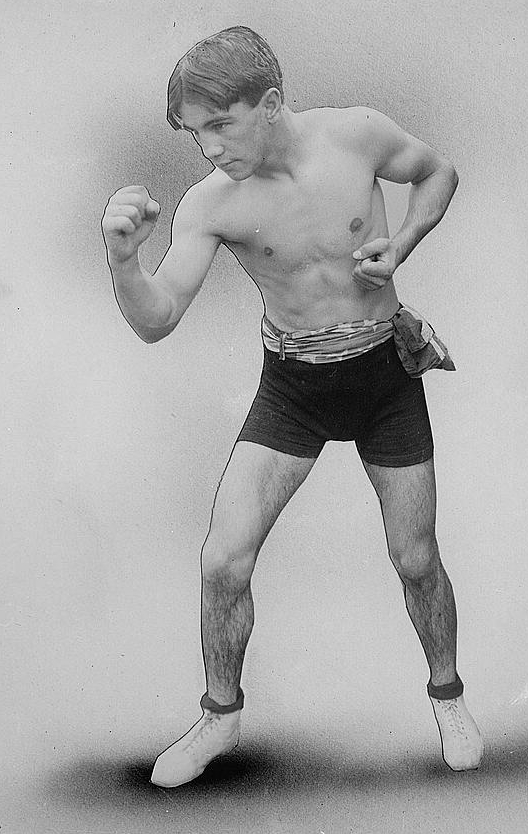
Ad Wolgast

He contended for the world lightweight title against Ad Wolgast on November 4, 1912, drawing in a ten round newspaper decision in New Orleans. Had Mandot won by knockout or technical knockout, he would have taken the title from Wolgast.

Leach Cross defeated Mandot on March 10, 1913, in a tenth round technical knockout in New Orleans. Cross was an exceptionally skilled New York based Jewish boxer. Mandot performed well in the first eight rounds, flooring Cross for no-counts in the fourth and fifth rounds. But Cross floored Mandot in the ninth with a crushing right and sent him to the canvas four more times, for the most part using rights to the jaw. In the tenth, after he was knocked down twice, Mandot's handlers threw in the towel only 15 seconds after the opening bell.

Mandot lost in a close bout to future lightweight champion English boxer Freddie Welsh on May 25, 1914, in a ten round newspaper decision at Pelican Stadium in New Orleans. The Times of Shreveport credited Welsh with five rounds, Mandot three, and two even.

The New Orleans lightweight defeated future world featherweight and jr. lightweight champion Johnny Dundee on July 4, 1914, in a close ten round newspaper decision of a no-decision bout in New Orleans. The Los Angeles Times, which believed Dundee won by a shade, admitted that Mandot won at long range in the majority of the rounds, but that Dundee fought better in the clinches. The Times gave Dundee the fourth through eighth by a slight margin, with Mandot taking the third, ninth and tenth.

He defeated future world featherweight champion Johnny Kilbane on December 7, 1914, in a very close newspaper decision. The Boston Globe wrote that Mandot was fresher at the end of the rough match, and his face was unmarked. The referee gave only a slight edge to Mandot.

Mandot drew in eight rounds with Jewish lightweight contender Frankie Callahan on December 14, 1914, in an eight round points decision in Memphis. The Los Angeles Times wrote that Mandot deserved the decision and that he had Callahan close to a knockout in the sixth, seventh, and eighth rounds, staggering him repeatedly. In the opinion of one reporter, Mandot landed more blows in all but the first, second, and possibly eighth rounds, but the bout was close, and particularly fierce in the final round. A local newspaper gave Mandot four rounds, Callahan two, and two even. Callahan probably gained points from taking the offensive in much of the bout, but his blows lacked the steam of Callahan's.

=== Contending for the world welterweight title ===
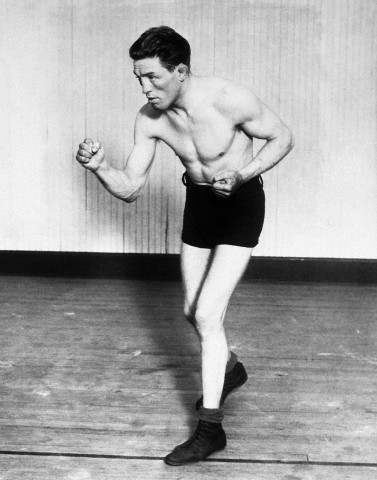
Ted "Kid" Lewis

On October 26, 1915, he contended for the world welterweight championship against British Jewish boxer Ted "Kid" Lewis, losing in a twelve round points decision at the Arena in Boston. Lewis had a clear victory, dominating at both long range and infighting, though Mandot stood up to the punishment and kept several rounds even. Lewis scored strongly with his right, dropping Mandot in the first and twelfth rounds.

Mandot fell to the incomparable future world lightweight champion Benny Leonard on December 17, 1915, in a seventh round knockout in New York. Never one to shrink from the toughest competition, The York Times wrote that the match, "was a brilliant display of scientific boxing and hard punching for the first six rounds". When Mandot rushed in the seventh, Leonard's straight left followed by a right cross to the jaw nearly ended the skillfully fought battle. Mandot rose to continue and was met with a final onslaught of blows from his challenger.

Before his full retirement from boxing, Mandot considered going into the New Orleans real estate business around 1916 and purchased a few buildings after his retirement.

Mandot defeated Joe Thomas in a tenth round technical knockout in New Orleans on April 30, 1917. Mandot had taken a strong lead in every round and Thomas was helpless by the tenth when the referee stopped the bout.

He lost to the less experienced Pal Moran on December 2, 1918, in a fifteen round points decision at the Tulane Arena in New Orleans. Mandot was soundly defeated and was down in the fourth round. Moran had not fought a professional bout from June 1917 to June 1918, and the Times-Picayune of New Orleans, wrote he was "a shadow of his former self", after his loss. He had drawn with Moran in a fifteen round points decision on July 15, 1918, at the Tulane Arena in a bout that was billed as a "Southern lightweight championship" and used a three judge system.

In 1918 he became a boxing instructor at Camp Beauregard, a WWI training camp, in Pineville, Louisiana.

=== Life after boxing ===
In one of his last known bouts, Mandot lost to Phil Virgets in a thirteen round technical knockout in New Orleans on November 21, 1921. He had previously drawn with Virgets the previous month in New Orleans in a ten round points decision. Mandot had worked as a manager, and owned his own gym, and was considering retirement from work at his gymnasium by 1922. In December 1924, he owned a few horses, and had won a race with his Colt, Gayly. He continued to earn income owning race horses through at least 1931.

He had a few real estate ventures in New Orleans, and owned interest in a bakery, where he worked at times, celebrating his 50th birthday by working there a full day. He owned both a tavern which failed, and a small eating house in New Orleans. His retirement from boxing left him with vision problems, that were not entirely disabling, though his fear of total blindness led him to depression.

He spent his later years cutting grass, and working as a messenger for New Orleans's Fair Grounds Racecourse

He died around July 29, 1956, in New Orleans by jumping off a bridge over Bayou St. John in what was ruled a suicide attempt as a weight was found attached to his waist. His body was recovered on July 31, and police approximated how long he had been in the water. Relatives claimed he had been suffering from depression.
