= Ad Wolgast =

American boxer (1888–1955)

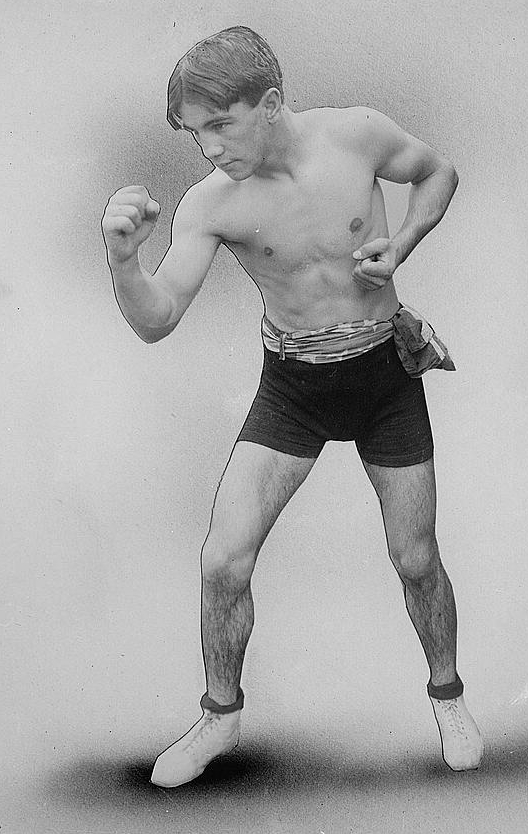
- Wolgast circa 1912-1913

Personal information
- Nickname: Michigan Wildcat
- Nationality: United States
- Born: Adolphus Wolgast; February 8, 1888 Cadillac, Michigan, U.S.
- Died: April 14, 1955 (aged 67) Camarillo, California, U.S.
- Height: 5 ft 4 in (163 cm)
- Weight: 118–133 lb (54–60 kg)

Boxing career
- Weight class: Lightweight
- Stance: Orthodox

Boxing record
- Total fights: 144
- Wins: 87
- Win by KO: 40
- Losses: 33
- Draws: 23
- No contests: 1

Adolphus Wolgast (February 8, 1888 – April 14, 1955), nicknamed Michigan Wildcat, was the world's lightweight champion from 1910 to 1912.

== Biography ==
Wolgast's siblings were fellow boxers Johnny Wolgast and Al Wolgast.

Wolgast trained on a meat-based diet. He was fond of eating steak and opposed the vegetarian diet of rival lightweight boxing champion Freddie Welsh.

=== World lightweight champion ===
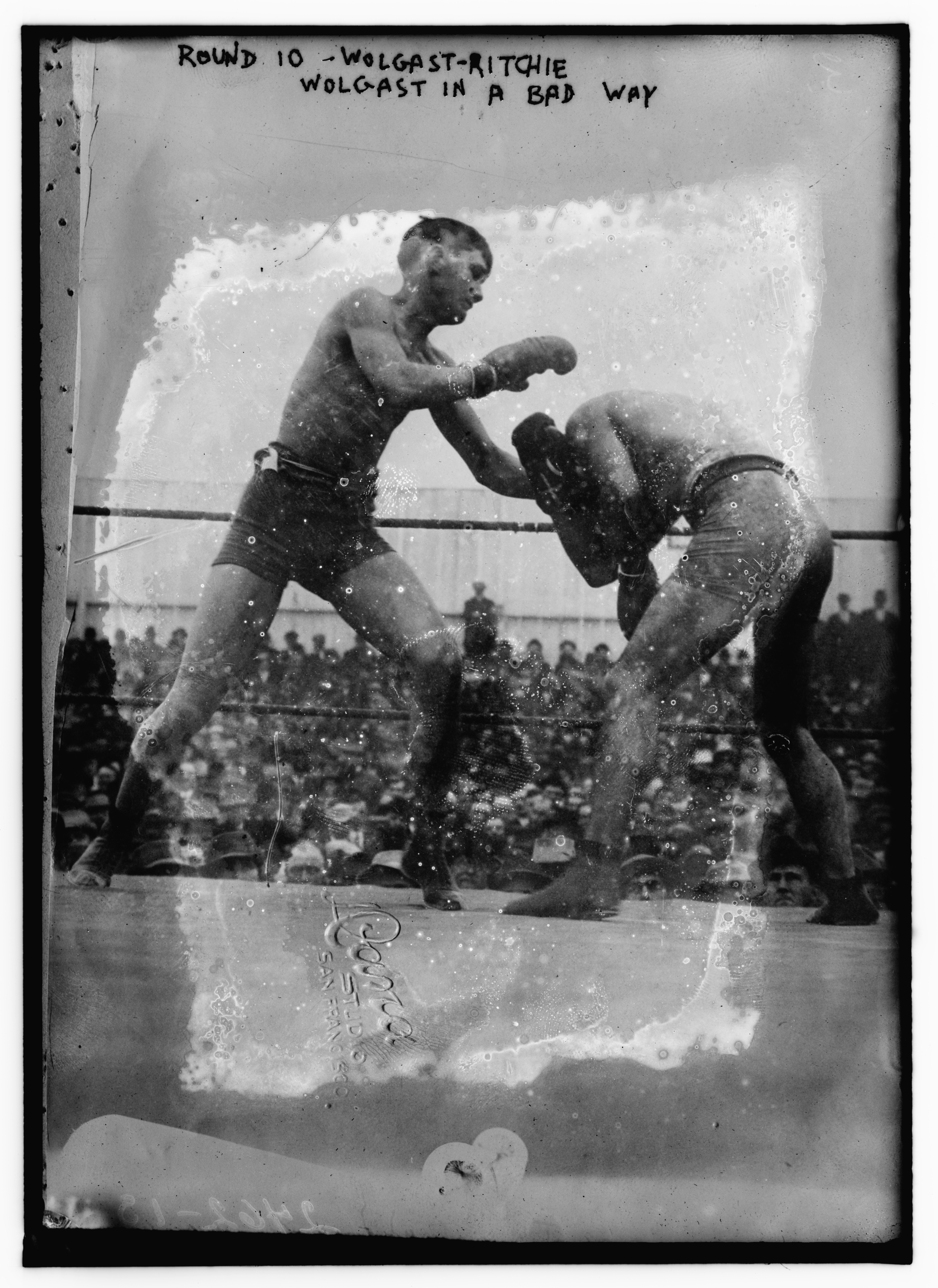
Wolgast (right) in his title fight against Willie Ritchie, 1912.

He turned professional in 1906, and on February 22, 1910 he won the World Lightweight Title with a technical knockout (TKO) during a 40-round bout with Battling Nelson. After the California bout, both fighters were arrested and charged with violating the anti-prizefighting law. Wolgast would later defend the title against Mexican Joe Rivers in 1912, a bout that caused controversy. Delivering simultaneous blows, they knocked each other out. Referee Jack Welch counted to ten and the bout was over. However, he awarded the win to Wolgast, claiming that Ad had started to rise before the fatal ten. Rivers' fans let out a roar, believing he had been fouled. To add to the confusion, the timekeeper insisted the round had ended when Welch reached the count of four. But Welch's ruling became the official verdict. Wolgast ultimately defended the belt five times before losing it to Willie Ritchie in 1912.

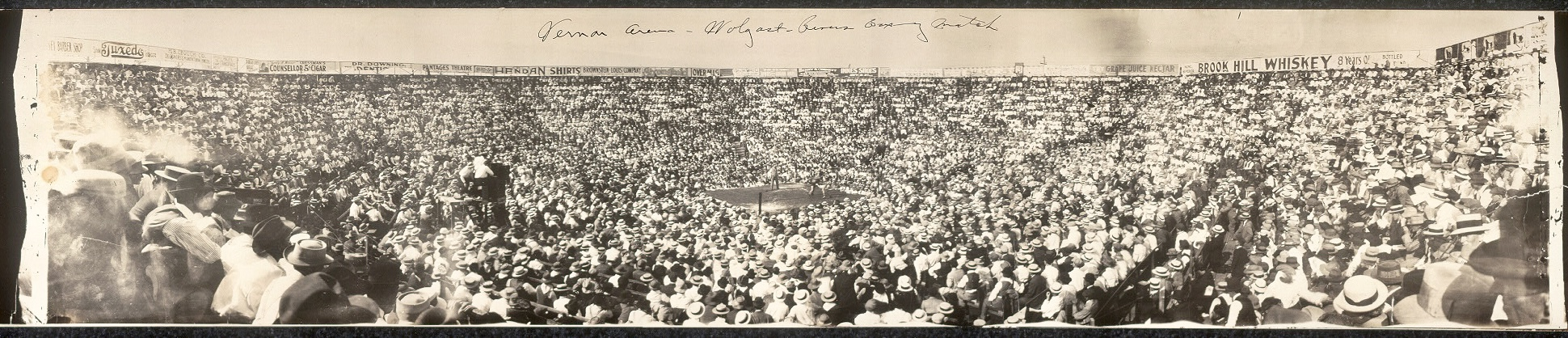
Panoramic photo of Wolgast–Rivers boxing match, July 4, 1912, at Vernon Arena

=== Later life ===
Wolgast was declared incompetent in 1917 and a guardianship was established for him. He suffered a nervous breakdown in 1918 and was placed in a sanitarium. He escaped and was later found living in the "North Woods" of California as a "mountain man." In December 1918 a Los Angeles court found him competent to handle his own affairs, and terminated the guardianship.

In the early 1920s, Jack Doyle, owner of a Vernon, California boxing venue, took Wolgast "under his wing," and allowed him to train at his boxing gym, although Wolgast was not to fight again.

== Death ==
In 1927 he was committed to Stockton State Hospital where he remained for the rest of his life. He died April 14, 1955 in Camarillo, California of heart complications.

== Professional boxing record ==
All information in this section is derived from BoxRec, unless otherwise stated.

=== Official record ===
144 fights	60 wins	13 losses
By knockout	40	3
By decision	19	6
By disqualification	1	4
Draws	17	
No contests	1	
Newspaper decisions/draws	53	

All newspaper decisions are officially regarded as “no decision” bouts and are not counted to the win/loss/draw column.

No.	Result	Record	Opponent	Type	Round	Date	Location	Note
144	Draw	60–13–17 (54)	Lee Morrissey	PTS	4	Sep 6, 1920	Savoy Arena, San Bernardino, California, U.S.	
143	Loss	60–13–16 (54)	Billy Alvarez	UD	4	Dec 23, 1919	Bakersfield Stadium, Bakersfield, California, U.S.	
142	Win	60–12–16 (54)	Walter Kane	KO	8 (10)	Oct 10, 1919	Yuma, Arizona, U.S.	
141	Draw	59–12–16 (54)	Lee Morrissey	PTS	10	Sep 10, 1919	Yuma Theatre, Yuma, Arizona, U.S.	
140	Loss	59–12–15 (54)	Earl France	PTS	10	Sep 1, 1919	Maricopa Athletic Club, Phoenix, Arizona, U.S.	
139	Draw	59–11–15 (54)	Frank Beaver	PTS	6	Aug 1, 1919	Airdome Arena, Yuma, Arizona, U.S.	
138	Draw	59–11–14 (54)	Frankie Russell	PTS	20	Nov 30, 1916	Louisiana Auditorium, New Orleans, Louisiana, U.S.	
137	Draw	59–11–13 (54)	Chet Neff	PTS	4	Oct 6, 1916	Dreamland Pavilion, Seattle, Washington, U.S.	
136	Loss	59–11–12 (54)	Battling Nick	PTS	4	Sep 29, 1916	Gritton's Arena, San Diego, California, U.S.	
135	Draw	59–10–12 (54)	Lee Morrissey	PTS	20	Sep 4, 1916	Idaho Falls, Idaho, U.S.	
134	Win	59–10–11 (54)	Frankie Callahan	NWS	10	Aug 25, 1916	Washington Park A.C., Brooklyn, New York City, New York, U.S.	
133	Loss	59–10–11 (53)	Freddie Welsh	DQ	11 (15)	Jul 4, 1916	Stockyards Stadium, Denver, Colorado, U.S.	For world lightweight title
132	NC	59–9–11 (53)	Stewart Donnelly	NC	3 (10)	Jun 20, 1916	Coliseum, Richmond, Indiana, U.S.	
131	Loss	59–9–11 (52)	Frankie Russell	DQ	4 (12)	Jun 13, 1916	Saint Louis, Missouri, U.S.	
130	Win	59–8–11 (52)	Frankie Murphy	TKO	5 (15)	Jun 2, 1916	Denver, Colorado, U.S.	
129	Win	58–8–11 (52)	Pat Gilbert	KO	6 (20)	May 17, 1916	Auditorium, Salt Lake City, Utah, U.S.	
128	Win	57–8–11 (52)	Willie Gradwell	TKO	6 (10)	May 3, 1916	Windsor A.C., Windsor, Ontario, Canada	
127	Win	56–8–11 (52)	Joe Flynn	PTS	15	Apr 28, 1916	National A.C., Denver, Colorado, U.S.	
126	Loss	55–8–11 (52)	Ever Hammer	NWS	10	Mar 31, 1916	Auditorium, Racine, Wisconsin, U.S.	
125	Loss	55–8–11 (51)	Freddie Welsh	NWS	10	Mar 6, 1916	Arcadia Rink, Milwaukee, Wisconsin, U.S.	
124	Draw	55–8–11 (50)	Oakland Frankie Burns	NWS	10	Feb 7, 1916	Kansas City, Missouri, U.S.	
123	Loss	55–8–11 (49)	Leach Cross	TKO	6 (10)	Dec 17, 1915	Harlem S.C., New York City, New York, U.S.	
122	Loss	55–7–11 (49)	Frank Ray Whitney	TKO	5 (10)	Dec 14, 1915	Lyric Theater, Atlanta, Georgia, U.S.	
121	Loss	55–6–11 (49)	Jimmy Murphy	NWS	6	Nov 29, 1915	Olympia A.C., Philadelphia, Pennsylvania, U.S.	
120	Win	55–6–11 (48)	Jimmy Murphy	NWS	10	Nov 17, 1915	La Crosse, Wisconsin, U.S.	
119	Win	55–6–11 (47)	Eddie McAndrews	NWS	6	Nov 8, 1915	Olympia A.C., Philadelphia, Pennsylvania, U.S.	
118	Win	55–6–11 (46)	Hal Stewart	NWS	10	Oct 28, 1915	Majestic Theatre, Fort Wayne, Indiana, U.S.	
117	Win	55–6–11 (45)	Gene Delmont	PTS	8	Oct 11, 1915	Memphis, Tennessee, U.S.	
116	Loss	54–6–11 (45)	Bobby Waugh	DQ	6 (15)	Sep 27, 1915	Shreveport, Louisiana, U.S.	
115	Win	54–5–11 (45)	Packy Hommey	NWS	10	Aug 30, 1915	Clermont Rink, New York City, New York, U.S.	
114	Loss	54–5–11 (44)	Joe Welling	NWS	10	Aug 6, 1915	Orpheum Theater, Duluth, Minnesota, U.S.	
113	Win	54–5–11 (43)	Dauber Jaeger	TKO	7 (10)	Aug 2, 1915	Armory B, Oshkosh, Wisconsin, U.S.	
112	Draw	53–5–11 (43)	Steve Ketchel	PTS	6	Jul 31, 1915	Forest Park, Illinois, U.S.	
111	Loss	53–5–10 (43)	Rocky Kansas	NWS	10	Jul 23, 1915	Buffalo, New York, U.S.	
110	Win	53–5–10 (42)	Young White	KO	7 (10)	Jun 9, 1915	Armory G, Appleton, Wisconsin, U.S.	
109	Loss	52–5–10 (42)	Leach Cross	NWS	10	Jun 2, 1915	St. Nicholas Arena, New York City, New York, U.S.	
108	Loss	52–5–10 (41)	Richie Mitchell	NWS	10	May 18, 1915	Elite Rink, Milwaukee, Wisconsin, U.S.	
107	Loss	52–5–10 (40)	Cy Smith	NWS	12	Feb 8, 1915	Olympic Coliseum, Columbus, Ohio, U.S.	
106	Loss	52–5–10 (39)	Freddie Welsh	TKO	8 (10)	Nov 2, 1914	Madison Square Garden, New York City, New York, U.S.	Wolgast broke a small bone in his right arm and could not continue
105	Loss	52–4–10 (39)	Tommy Gary	NWS	10	Oct 27, 1914	Streator, Illinois, U.S.	
104	Win	52–4–10 (38)	Billy Wagner	NWS	10	Oct 23, 1914	Armory, Flint, Michigan, U.S.	
103	Loss	52–4–10 (37)	Joe Mandot	NWS	10	Sep 18, 1914	Hippodrome, Milwaukee, Wisconsin, U.S.	
102	Win	52–4–10 (36)	Billy Wagner	NWS	10	May 1, 1914	Kalamazoo, Michigan, U.S.	
101	Loss	52–4–10 (35)	Johnny Tillman	NWS	10	Apr 23, 1914	Hudson, Wisconsin, U.S.	
100	Loss	52–4–10 (34)	Willie Ritchie	NWS	10	Mar 12, 1914	Auditorium, Milwaukee, Wisconsin, U.S.	World lightweight title (USA version) at stake; (Via KO only)
99	Win	52–4–10 (33)	Jack Lepper	TKO	4 (10)	Feb 23, 1914	Ionia, Michigan, U.S.	
98	Win	51–4–10 (33)	Tommy Gary	NWS	10	Feb 16, 1914	Heuck's Opera House, Cincinnati, Ohio, U.S.	
97	Win	51–4–10 (32)	Rudy Unholz	TKO	2 (10)	Jan 29, 1914	Fond du Lac, Wisconsin, U.S.	
96	Draw	50–4–10 (32)	Mexican Joe Rivers	NWS	10	Jan 23, 1914	Dreamland Park, Milwaukee, Wisconsin, U.S.	
95	Win	50–4–10 (31)	Jack Redmond	TKO	5 (10)	Jan 1, 1914	Auditorium, Milwaukee, Wisconsin, U.S.	
94	Loss	49–4–10 (31)	Charley White	NWS	10	Dec 19, 1913	Dreamland Park, Milwaukee, Wisconsin, U.S.	
93	Win	49–4–10 (30)	Battling Nelson	NWS	10	Oct 13, 1913	Southside A.A., Milwaukee, Wisconsin, U.S.	
92	Loss	49–4–10 (29)	Joe Azevedo	PTS	10	Sep 1, 1913	Wheelmen Club, Oakland, California, U.S.	
91	Loss	49–3–10 (29)	Harlem Tommy Murphy	PTS	20	Apr 19, 1913	Coffroth's Arena, Daly City, California, U.S.	
90	Draw	49–2–10 (29)	Harlem Tommy Murphy	PTS	20	Feb 22, 1913	Coffroth's Arena, Daly City, California, U.S.	
89	Loss	49–2–9 (29)	Willie Ritchie	DQ	16 (20)	Nov 28, 1912	Coffroth's Mission Street Arena, Daly City, California, U.S.	Lost world lightweight title (USA version)
88	Draw	49–1–9 (29)	Joe Mandot	NWS	10	Nov 4, 1912	Pelican Stadium, New Orleans, Louisiana, U.S.	World lightweight title (USA version) at stake; (via KO only)
87	Draw	49–1–9 (28)	Freddie Daniels	NWS	6	Oct 25, 1912	Quincy, Illinois, U.S.	
86	Draw	49–1–9 (27)	Teddy Maloney	NWS	6	Oct 16, 1912	Olympia A.C., Philadelphia, Pennsylvania, U.S.	
85	Win	49–1–9 (26)	Mexican Joe Rivers	KO	13 (20)	Jul 4, 1912	Arena, Vernon, California, U.S.	Retained world lightweight title (USA version)
84	Win	48–1–9 (26)	Young Jack O'Brien	NWS	6	May 31, 1912	American A.C., Philadelphia, Pennsylvania, U.S.	
83	Win	48–1–9 (25)	Freddie Daniels	NWS	4	May 17, 1912	Saint Joseph, Missouri, U.S.	
82	Loss	48–1–9 (24)	Willie Ritchie	NWS	4	May 11, 1912	Coffroth's Arena, San Francisco, California, U.S.	
81	Win	48–1–9 (23)	Owen Moran	KO	13 (20)	Jul 4, 1911	Eighth Street Arena, San Francisco, California, U.S.	Retained world lightweight title (USA version)
80	Win	47–1–9 (23)	Oakland Frankie Burns	TKO	17 (20)	May 27, 1911	Eighth Street Arena, San Francisco, California, U.S.	Retained world lightweight title (USA version)
79	Win	46–1–9 (23)	One Round Hogan	TKO	2 (10)	Apr 26, 1911	Harlem River Casino, New York City, New York, U.S.	Retained world lightweight title (USA version)
78	Win	45–1–9 (23)	Anton LaGrave	TKO	5 (20)	Mar 31, 1911	Auditorium Pavilion, San Francisco, California, U.S.	Retained world lightweight title (USA version)
77	Win	44–1–9 (23)	George Memsic	TKO	9 (20)	Mar 17, 1911	Arena, Vernon, California, U.S.	Retained world lightweight title (USA version); Both fighters arrested and charged with violating the anti-prizefight law
76	Loss	43–1–9 (23)	Knockout Brown	NWS	10	Mar 3, 1911	National S.C., New York City, New York, U.S.	
75	Loss	43–1–9 (22)	Knockout Brown	NWS	6	Feb 8, 1911	American A.C., Philadelphia, Pennsylvania, U.S.	
74	Win	43–1–9 (21)	Tommy McFarland	NWS	10	Sep 29, 1910	Fond du Lac, Wisconsin, U.S.	
73	Win	43–1–9 (20)	Freddie Cole	NWS	6	Aug 9, 1910	Muncie, Indiana, U.S.	
72	Loss	43–1–9 (19)	Jack Redmond	NWS	10	Jun 10, 1910	Badger A.C., Milwaukee, Wisconsin, U.S.	
71	Win	43–1–9 (18)	Battling Nelson	TKO	40 (45)	Feb 22, 1910	Arena, Point Richmond, California, U.S.	Won world lightweight title (USA version)
70	Win	42–1–9 (18)	George Memsic	NWS	10	Jan 7, 1910	Naud Junction Pavilion, Los Angeles, California, U.S.	
69	Win	42–1–9 (17)	Frank Picato	NWS	10	Dec 21, 1909	Naud Junction Pavilion, Los Angeles, California, U.S.	
68	Win	42–1–9 (16)	Lew Powell	PTS	20	Nov 29, 1909	Dreamland Rink, San Francisco, California, U.S.	During the 14th round, fan William E. Moldrop collapsed and died shortly thereafter
67	Win	41–1–9 (16)	Henri Piet	KO	2 (20)	Nov 14, 1909	Westside A.C., New Orleans, Louisiana, U.S.	
66	Win	40–1–9 (16)	Jack Ashton	NWS	3	Sep 17, 1909	Airdome, Grand Rapids, Michigan, U.S.	
65	Win	40–1–9 (15)	Johnny Wirth	NWS	3	Sep 17, 1909	Airdome, Grand Rapids, Michigan, U.S.	
64	Win	40–1–9 (14)	Eddie Nelson	NWS	3	Sep 16, 1909	Airdome, Grand Rapids, Michigan, U.S.	
63	Win	40–1–9 (13)	Pete Savoy	NWS	3	Sep 15, 1909	Airdome, Grand Rapids, Michigan, U.S.	
62	Win	40–1–9 (12)	Joe Galligan	NWS	3	Sep 14, 1909	Airdome, Grand Rapids, Michigan, U.S.	
61	Draw	40–1–9 (11)	Matty Baldwin	PTS	12	Sep 7, 1909	Armory A.A., Boston, Massachusetts, U.S.	
60	Loss	40–1–8 (11)	Harlem Tommy Murphy	NWS	6	Sep 1, 1909	Duquesne Garden, Pittsburgh, Pennsylvania, U.S.	
59	Win	40–1–8 (10)	Battling Nelson	NWS	10	Jul 13, 1909	Naud Junction Pavilion, Los Angeles, California, U.S.	
58	Loss	40–1–8 (9)	Tommy O'Toole	NWS	6	Jun 19, 1909	National A.C., Philadelphia, Pennsylvania, U.S.	
57	Win	40–1–8 (8)	Teddy Peppers	KO	10 (10)	Jun 11, 1909	Empire A.C., Kansas City, Missouri, U.S.	
56	Win	39–1–8 (8)	Tommy Langdon	KO	1 (6)	Jun 5, 1909	National A.C., Philadelphia, Pennsylvania, U.S.	
55	Win	38–1–8 (8)	George Memsic	NWS	10	Apr 16, 1909	Naud Junction, Los Angeles, California, U.S.	
54	Win	38–1–8 (7)	Frank Picato	NWS	10	Mar 30, 1909	McCarey's Pavilion, Los Angeles, California, U.S.	
53	Win	38–1–8 (6)	Harry Baker	NWS	10	Mar 9, 1909	McCarey's Pavilion, Los Angeles, California, U.S.	
52	Win	38–1–8 (5)	Walter Little	KO	4 (20)	Feb 26, 1909	Jeffries A.C., Vernon, California, U.S.	
51	Win	37–1–8 (5)	Danny Webster	NWS	10	Feb 23, 1909	Jack McCarey's Club, Los Angeles, California, U.S.	
50	Draw	37–1–8 (4)	Abe Attell	NWS	10	Dec 11, 1908	Naud Junction Pavilion, Los Angeles, California, U.S.	
49	Win	37–1–8 (3)	Young Kid McCoy	KO	2 (10)	Dec 4, 1908	Jack McCarey's Club, Los Angeles, California, U.S.	
48	Win	36–1–8 (3)	Bubbles Robinson	NWS	10	Nov 13, 1908	McCarey's Pavilion, Los Angeles, California, U.S.	
47	Win	36–1–8 (2)	Danny Webster	KO	18 (25)	Sep 29, 1908	Jeffries' Arena, Vernon, California, U.S.	
46	Draw	35–1–8 (2)	Danny Goodman	PTS	8	Aug 26, 1908	Racine, Wisconsin, U.S.	
45	Draw	35–1–7 (2)	Frankie Conley	PTS	8	May 29, 1908	Lakeside Auditorium, Racine, Wisconsin, U.S.	
44	Win	35–1–6 (2)	Jeff O'Connell	PTS	8	May 26, 1908	Fond du Lac, Wisconsin, U.S.	
43	Win	34–1–6 (2)	Frankie Neil	PTS	10	May 6, 1908	Green Valley A.C., Milwaukee, Wisconsin, U.S.	
42	Win	33–1–6 (2)	Kid Beebe	PTS	10	Apr 24, 1908	Green Valley A.C., Milwaukee, Wisconsin, U.S.	
41	Loss	32–1–6 (2)	Owen Moran	NWS	6	Apr 7, 1908	National A.C., New York City, New York, U.S.	
40	Win	32–1–6 (1)	Jack Redmond	PTS	6	Mar 30, 1908	Green Valley A.C., Milwaukee, Wisconsin, U.S.	
39	Win	31–1–6 (1)	Harry Baker	PTS	10	Feb 14, 1908	Green Valley A.C., Milwaukee, Wisconsin, U.S.	
38	Win	30–1–6 (1)	Jack Nolan	KO	1 (?)	Jan 18, 1908	Star Theater, Milwaukee, Wisconsin, U.S.	
37	Win	29–1–6 (1)	Willie Sullivan	TKO	5 (?)	Jan 17, 1908	Milwaukee Boxing Club, Milwaukee, Wisconsin, U.S.	
36	Win	28–1–6 (1)	Buck Plotell	KO	5 (?)	Jan 1, 1908	Saint Joseph, Missouri, U.S.	
35	Win	27–1–6 (1)	Ole Nelson	KO	1 (?)	Dec 30, 1907	Schlitz Park, Milwaukee, Wisconsin, U.S.	
34	Win	26–1–6 (1)	Biz Mackey	NWS	6	Nov 21, 1907	Coliseum, Davenport, Iowa, U.S.	
33	Draw	26–1–6	Frankie Conley	PTS	8	Oct 15, 1907	Green Valley A.C., Milwaukee, Wisconsin, U.S.	
32	Win	26–1–5	Irish Tom Landers	KO	5 (?)	Oct 10, 1907	Waukegan, Illinois, U.S.	
31	Win	25–1–5	Jeff O'Connell	PTS	15	Sep 15, 1907	Saint Joseph, Missouri, U.S.	
30	Win	24–1–5	Frankie Conley	PTS	8	Sep 10, 1907	Green Valley A.C., Milwaukee, Wisconsin, U.S.	
29	Draw	23–1–5	Jeff O'Connell	PTS	6	Aug 23, 1907	Racine, Wisconsin, U.S.	
28	Win	23–1–4	Danny Goodman	TKO	4 (?)	Jun 28, 1907	Hippodrome, Milwaukee, Wisconsin, U.S.	
27	Draw	22–1–4	Percy Cove	PTS	8	Jun 12, 1907	Armory B, Oshkosh, Wisconsin, U.S.	
26	Win	22–1–3	Young Morris	TKO	4 (?)	May 25, 1907	Star B.C., Milwaukee, Wisconsin, U.S.	
25	Win	21–1–3	Buddy Glover	TKO	7 (?)	May 21, 1907	Fond du Lac, Wisconsin, U.S.	
24	Win	20–1–3	Tom Campbell	PTS	15	Apr 30, 1907	Saint Joseph, Missouri, U.S.	
23	Draw	19–1–3	Jack Redmond	PTS	6	Apr 13, 1907	Star B.C., Milwaukee, Wisconsin, U.S.	
22	Win	19–1–2	Jeff O'Connell	PTS	6	Apr 9, 1907	Green Valley A.C., Milwaukee, Wisconsin, U.S.	
21	Win	18–1–2	Kid Brady	KO	1 (?)	Mar 29, 1907	Eagle A.C., Milwaukee, Wisconsin, U.S.	
20	Draw	17–1–2	Buck Plotell	PTS	15	Mar 19, 1907	Eagles Club, Saint Joseph, Missouri, U.S.	
19	Win	17–1–1	Buddy Glover	DQ	3 (?)	Mar 15, 1907	Milwaukee Boxing Club, Milwaukee, Wisconsin, U.S.	
18	Win	16–1–1	Jack Nolan	PTS	6	Mar 12, 1907	Green Valley A.C., Milwaukee, Wisconsin, U.S.	
17	Win	15–1–1	Kid Morgan	KO	2 (?)	Mar 1, 1907	Fond du Lac, Wisconsin, U.S.	
16	Draw	14–1–1	Jack Nolan	PTS	6	Feb 12, 1907	Green Valley A.C., Milwaukee, Wisconsin, U.S.	
15	Win	14–1	Gene McGovern	PTS	6	Feb 1, 1907	Badger A.C., Milwaukee, Wisconsin, U.S.	
14	Win	13–1	Johnny DeForest	KO	5 (?)	Nov 15, 1906	Lansing, Michigan, U.S.	
13	Win	12–1	Peter Kelly	KO	3 (?)	Oct 19, 1906	Grand Rapids, Michigan, U.S.	
12	Win	11–1	Young Mitchell	KO	3 (?)	Oct 15, 1906	Grand Rapids, Michigan, U.S.	
11	Win	10–1	Young Kilrain	KO	5 (?)	Sep 29, 1906	Grand Rapids, Michigan, U.S.	
10	Win	9–1	Kid Cannon	PTS	6	Sep 13, 1906	Grand Rapids, Michigan, U.S.	
9	Win	8–1	Ed Smith	KO	7 (?)	Sep 3, 1906	Petoskey, Michigan, U.S.	
8	Win	7–1	Charles Morgan	PTS	4	Aug 11, 1906	Godfrey's Theatre, Grand Rapids, Michigan, U.S.	
7	Win	6–1	Ted Smith	PTS	4	Aug 9, 1906	Grand Rapids, Michigan, U.S.	
6	Win	5–1	Kid Bond	KO	4 (4)	Aug 6, 1906	Godfrey's Theatre, Grand Rapids, Michigan, U.S.	
5	Win	4–1	Art Dietrich	KO	3 (?)	Aug 4, 1906	Godfrey's Theatre, Grand Rapids, Michigan, U.S.	
4	Win	3–1	Young Kilrain	PTS	4	Aug 3, 1906	Grand Rapids, Michigan, U.S.	
3	Loss	2–1	Eddie Nelson	PTS	4	Jul 12, 1906	Powers' Opera House, Grand Rapids, Michigan, U.S.	
2	Win	2–0	Eddie Nelson	KO	3 (4)	Jun 28, 1906	Powers' Opera House, Grand Rapids, Michigan, U.S.	
1	Win	1–0	Kid Moore	PTS	6	Jun 10, 1906	Petoskey, Michigan, U.S.	

=== Unofficial record ===
144 fights	87 wins	33 losses
By knockout	40	3
By decision	46	26
By disqualification	1	4
Draws	23	
No contests	1	

Record with the inclusion of newspaper decisions to the win/loss/draw column.

No.	Result	Record	Opponent	Type	Round	Date	Location	Notes
144	Draw	87–33–23 (1)	Lee Morrissey	PTS	4	Sep 6, 1920	Savoy Arena, San Bernardino, California, U.S.	
143	Loss	87–33–22 (1)	Billy Alvarez	UD	4	Dec 23, 1919	Bakersfield Stadium, Bakersfield, California, U.S.	
142	Win	87–32–22 (1)	Walter Kane	KO	8 (10)	Oct 10, 1919	Yuma, Arizona, U.S.	
141	Draw	86–32–22 (1)	Lee Morrissey	PTS	10	Sep 10, 1919	Yuma Theatre, Yuma, Arizona, U.S.	
140	Loss	86–32–21 (1)	Earl France	PTS	10	Sep 1, 1919	Maricopa Athletic Club, Phoenix, Arizona, U.S.	
139	Draw	86–31–21 (1)	Frank Beaver	PTS	6	Aug 1, 1919	Airdome Arena, Yuma, Arizona, U.S.	
138	Draw	86–31–20 (1)	Frankie Russell	PTS	20	Nov 30, 1916	Louisiana Auditorium, New Orleans, Louisiana, U.S.	
137	Draw	86–31–19 (1)	Chet Neff	PTS	4	Oct 6, 1916	Dreamland Pavilion, Seattle, Washington, U.S.	
136	Loss	86–31–18 (1)	Battling Nick	PTS	4	Sep 29, 1916	Gritton's Arena, San Diego, California, U.S.	
135	Draw	86–30–18 (1)	Lee Morrissey	PTS	20	Sep 4, 1916	Idaho Falls, Idaho, U.S.	
134	Win	86–30–17 (1)	Frankie Callahan	NWS	10	Aug 25, 1916	Washington Park A.C., Brooklyn, New York City, New York, U.S.	
133	Loss	85–30–17 (1)	Freddie Welsh	DQ	11 (15)	Jul 4, 1916	Stockyards Stadium, Denver, Colorado, U.S.	For world lightweight title
132	NC	85–29–17 (1)	Stewart Donnelly	NC	3 (10)	Jun 20, 1916	Coliseum, Richmond, Indiana, U.S.	
131	Loss	85–29–17	Frankie Russell	DQ	4 (12)	Jun 13, 1916	Saint Louis, Missouri, U.S.	
130	Win	85–28–17	Frankie Murphy	TKO	5 (15)	Jun 2, 1916	Denver, Colorado, U.S.	
129	Win	84–28–17	Pat Gilbert	KO	6 (20)	May 17, 1916	Auditorium, Salt Lake City, Utah, U.S.	
128	Win	83–28–17	Willie Gradwell	TKO	6 (10)	May 3, 1916	Windsor A.C., Windsor, Ontario, Canada	
127	Win	82–28–17	Joe Flynn	PTS	15	Apr 28, 1916	National A.C., Denver, Colorado, U.S.	
126	Loss	81–28–17	Ever Hammer	NWS	10	Mar 31, 1916	Auditorium, Racine, Wisconsin, U.S.	
125	Loss	81–27–17	Freddie Welsh	NWS	10	Mar 6, 1916	Arcadia Rink, Milwaukee, Wisconsin, U.S.	
124	Draw	81–26–17	Oakland Frankie Burns	NWS	10	Feb 7, 1916	Kansas City, Missouri, U.S.	
123	Loss	81–26–16	Leach Cross	TKO	6 (10)	Dec 17, 1915	Harlem S.C., New York City, New York, U.S.	
122	Loss	81–25–16	Frank Ray Whitney	TKO	5 (10)	Dec 14, 1915	Lyric Theater, Atlanta, Georgia, U.S.	
121	Loss	81–24–16	Jimmy Murphy	NWS	6	Nov 29, 1915	Olympia A.C., Philadelphia, Pennsylvania, U.S.	
120	Win	81–23–16	Jimmy Murphy	NWS	10	Nov 17, 1915	La Crosse, Wisconsin, U.S.	
119	Win	80–23–16	Eddie McAndrews	NWS	6	Nov 8, 1915	Olympia A.C., Philadelphia, Pennsylvania, U.S.	
118	Win	79–23–16	Hal Stewart	NWS	10	Oct 28, 1915	Majestic Theatre, Fort Wayne, Indiana, U.S.	
117	Win	78–23–16	Gene Delmont	PTS	8	Oct 11, 1915	Memphis, Tennessee, U.S.	
116	Loss	77–23–16	Bobby Waugh	DQ	6 (15)	Sep 27, 1915	Shreveport, Louisiana, U.S.	
115	Win	77–22–16	Packy Hommey	NWS	10	Aug 30, 1915	Clermont Rink, New York City, New York, U.S.	
114	Loss	76–22–16	Joe Welling	NWS	10	Aug 6, 1915	Orpheum Theater, Duluth, Minnesota, U.S.	
113	Win	76–21–16	Dauber Jaeger	TKO	7 (10)	Aug 2, 1915	Armory B, Oshkosh, Wisconsin, U.S.	
112	Draw	75–21–16	Steve Ketchel	PTS	6	Jul 31, 1915	Forest Park, Illinois, U.S.	
111	Loss	75–21–15	Rocky Kansas	NWS	10	Jul 23, 1915	Buffalo, New York, U.S.	
110	Win	75–20–15	Young White	KO	7 (10)	Jun 9, 1915	Armory G, Appleton, Wisconsin, U.S.	
109	Loss	74–20–15	Leach Cross	NWS	10	Jun 2, 1915	St. Nicholas Arena, New York City, New York, U.S.	
108	Loss	74–19–15	Richie Mitchell	NWS	10	May 18, 1915	Elite Rink, Milwaukee, Wisconsin, U.S.	
107	Loss	74–18–15	Cy Smith	NWS	12	Feb 8, 1915	Olympic Coliseum, Columbus, Ohio, U.S.	
106	Loss	74–17–15	Freddie Welsh	TKO	8 (10)	Nov 2, 1914	Madison Square Garden, New York City, New York, U.S.	Wolgast broke a small bone in his right arm and could not continue
105	Loss	74–16–15	Tommy Gary	NWS	10	Oct 27, 1914	Streator, Illinois, U.S.	
104	Win	74–15–15	Billy Wagner	NWS	10	Oct 23, 1914	Armory, Flint, Michigan, U.S.	
103	Loss	73–15–15	Joe Mandot	NWS	10	Sep 18, 1914	Hippodrome, Milwaukee, Wisconsin, U.S.	
102	Win	73–14–15	Billy Wagner	NWS	10	May 1, 1914	Kalamazoo, Michigan, U.S.	
101	Loss	72–14–15	Johnny Tillman	NWS	10	Apr 23, 1914	Hudson, Wisconsin, U.S.	
100	Loss	72–13–15	Willie Ritchie	NWS	10	Mar 12, 1914	Auditorium, Milwaukee, Wisconsin, U.S.	World lightweight title (USA version) at stake; (Via KO only)
99	Win	72–12–15	Jack Lepper	TKO	4 (10)	Feb 23, 1914	Ionia, Michigan, U.S.	
98	Win	71–12–15	Tommy Gary	NWS	10	Feb 16, 1914	Heuck's Opera House, Cincinnati, Ohio, U.S.	
97	Win	70–12–15	Rudy Unholz	TKO	2 (10)	Jan 29, 1914	Fond du Lac, Wisconsin, U.S.	
96	Draw	69–12–15	Mexican Joe Rivers	NWS	10	Jan 23, 1914	Dreamland Park, Milwaukee, Wisconsin, U.S.	
95	Win	69–12–14	Jack Redmond	TKO	5 (10)	Jan 1, 1914	Auditorium, Milwaukee, Wisconsin, U.S.	
94	Loss	68–12–14	Charley White	NWS	10	Dec 19, 1913	Dreamland Park, Milwaukee, Wisconsin, U.S.	
93	Win	68–11–14	Battling Nelson	NWS	10	Oct 13, 1913	Southside A.A., Milwaukee, Wisconsin, U.S.	
92	Loss	67–11–14	Joe Azevedo	PTS	10	Sep 1, 1913	Wheelmen Club, Oakland, California, U.S.	
91	Loss	67–10–14	Harlem Tommy Murphy	PTS	20	Apr 19, 1913	Coffroth's Arena, Daly City, California, U.S.	
90	Draw	67–9–14	Harlem Tommy Murphy	PTS	20	Feb 22, 1913	Coffroth's Arena, Daly City, California, U.S.	
89	Loss	67–9–13	Willie Ritchie	DQ	16 (20)	Nov 28, 1912	Coffroth's Mission Street Arena, Daly City, California, U.S.	Lost world lightweight title (USA version)
88	Draw	67–8–13	Joe Mandot	NWS	10	Nov 4, 1912	Pelican Stadium, New Orleans, Louisiana, U.S.	World lightweight title (USA version) at stake; (via KO only)
87	Draw	67–8–12	Freddie Daniels	NWS	6	Oct 25, 1912	Quincy, Illinois, U.S.	
86	Draw	67–8–11	Teddy Maloney	NWS	6	Oct 16, 1912	Olympia A.C., Philadelphia, Pennsylvania, U.S.	
85	Win	67–8–10	Mexican Joe Rivers	KO	13 (20)	Jul 4, 1912	Arena, Vernon, California, U.S.	Retained world lightweight title (USA version)
84	Win	66–8–10	Young Jack O'Brien	NWS	6	May 31, 1912	American A.C., Philadelphia, Pennsylvania, U.S.	
83	Win	65–8–10	Freddie Daniels	NWS	4	May 17, 1912	Saint Joseph, Missouri, U.S.	
82	Loss	64–8–10	Willie Ritchie	NWS	4	May 11, 1912	Coffroth's Arena, San Francisco, California, U.S.	
81	Win	64–7–10	Owen Moran	KO	13 (20)	Jul 4, 1911	Eighth Street Arena, San Francisco, California, U.S.	Retained world lightweight title (USA version)
80	Win	63–7–10	Oakland Frankie Burns	TKO	17 (20)	May 27, 1911	Eighth Street Arena, San Francisco, California, U.S.	Retained world lightweight title (USA version)
79	Win	62–7–10	One Round Hogan	TKO	2 (10)	Apr 26, 1911	Harlem River Casino, New York City, New York, U.S.	Retained world lightweight title (USA version)
78	Win	61–7–10	Anton LaGrave	TKO	5 (20)	Mar 31, 1911	Auditorium Pavilion, San Francisco, California, U.S.	Retained world lightweight title (USA version)
77	Win	60–7–10	George Memsic	TKO	9 (20)	Mar 17, 1911	Arena, Vernon, California, U.S.	Retained world lightweight title (USA version); Both fighters arrested and charged with violating the anti-prizefight law
76	Loss	59–7–10	Knockout Brown	NWS	10	Mar 3, 1911	National S.C., New York City, New York, U.S.	
75	Loss	59–6–10	Knockout Brown	NWS	6	Feb 8, 1911	American A.C., Philadelphia, Pennsylvania, U.S.	
74	Win	59–5–10	Tommy McFarland	NWS	10	Sep 29, 1910	Fond du Lac, Wisconsin, U.S.	
73	Win	58–5–10	Freddie Cole	NWS	6	Aug 9, 1910	Muncie, Indiana, U.S.	
72	Loss	57–5–10	Jack Redmond	NWS	10	Jun 10, 1910	Badger A.C., Milwaukee, Wisconsin, U.S.	
71	Win	57–4–10	Battling Nelson	TKO	40 (45)	Feb 22, 1910	Arena, Point Richmond, California, U.S.	Won world lightweight title (USA version)
70	Win	56–4–10	George Memsic	NWS	10	Jan 7, 1910	Naud Junction Pavilion, Los Angeles, California, U.S.	
69	Win	55–4–10	Frank Picato	NWS	10	Dec 21, 1909	Naud Junction Pavilion, Los Angeles, California, U.S.	
68	Win	54–4–10	Lew Powell	PTS	20	Nov 29, 1909	Dreamland Rink, San Francisco, California, U.S.	During the 14th round, fan William E. Moldrop collapsed and died shortly thereafter
67	Win	53–4–10	Henri Piet	KO	2 (20)	Nov 14, 1909	Westside A.C., New Orleans, Louisiana, U.S.	
66	Win	52–4–10	Jack Ashton	NWS	3	Sep 17, 1909	Airdome, Grand Rapids, Michigan, U.S.	
65	Win	51–4–10	Johnny Wirth	NWS	3	Sep 17, 1909	Airdome, Grand Rapids, Michigan, U.S.	
64	Win	50–4–10	Eddie Nelson	NWS	3	Sep 16, 1909	Airdome, Grand Rapids, Michigan, U.S.	
63	Win	49–4–10	Pete Savoy	NWS	3	Sep 15, 1909	Airdome, Grand Rapids, Michigan, U.S.	
62	Win	48–4–10	Joe Galligan	NWS	3	Sep 14, 1909	Airdome, Grand Rapids, Michigan, U.S.	
61	Draw	47–4–10	Matty Baldwin	PTS	12	Sep 7, 1909	Armory A.A., Boston, Massachusetts, U.S.	
60	Loss	47–4–9	Harlem Tommy Murphy	NWS	6	Sep 1, 1909	Duquesne Garden, Pittsburgh, Pennsylvania, U.S.	
59	Win	47–3–9	Battling Nelson	NWS	10	Jul 13, 1909	Naud Junction Pavilion, Los Angeles, California, U.S.	
58	Loss	46–3–9	Tommy O'Toole	NWS	6	Jun 19, 1909	National A.C., Philadelphia, Pennsylvania, U.S.	
57	Win	46–2–9	Teddy Peppers	KO	10 (10)	Jun 11, 1909	Empire A.C., Kansas City, Missouri, U.S.	
56	Win	45–2–9	Tommy Langdon	KO	1 (6)	Jun 5, 1909	National A.C., Philadelphia, Pennsylvania, U.S.	
55	Win	44–2–9	George Memsic	NWS	10	Apr 16, 1909	Naud Junction, Los Angeles, California, U.S.	
54	Win	43–2–9	Frank Picato	NWS	10	Mar 30, 1909	McCarey's Pavilion, Los Angeles, California, U.S.	
53	Win	42–2–9	Harry Baker	NWS	10	Mar 9, 1909	McCarey's Pavilion, Los Angeles, California, U.S.	
52	Win	41–2–9	Walter Little	KO	4 (20)	Feb 26, 1909	Jeffries A.C., Vernon, California, U.S.	
51	Win	40–2–9	Danny Webster	NWS	10	Feb 23, 1909	Jack McCarey's Club, Los Angeles, California, U.S.	
50	Draw	39–2–9	Abe Attell	NWS	10	Dec 11, 1908	Naud Junction Pavilion, Los Angeles, California, U.S.	
49	Win	39–2–8	Young Kid McCoy	KO	2 (10)	Dec 4, 1908	Jack McCarey's Club, Los Angeles, California, U.S.	
48	Win	38–2–8	Bubbles Robinson	NWS	10	Nov 13, 1908	McCarey's Pavilion, Los Angeles, California, U.S.	
47	Win	37–2–8	Danny Webster	KO	18 (25)	Sep 29, 1908	Jeffries' Arena, Vernon, California, U.S.	
46	Draw	36–2–8	Danny Goodman	PTS	8	Aug 26, 1908	Racine, Wisconsin, U.S.	
45	Draw	36–2–7	Frankie Conley	PTS	8	May 29, 1908	Lakeside Auditorium, Racine, Wisconsin, U.S.	
44	Win	36–2–6	Jeff O'Connell	PTS	8	May 26, 1908	Fond du Lac, Wisconsin, U.S.	
43	Win	35–2–6	Frankie Neil	PTS	10	May 6, 1908	Green Valley A.C., Milwaukee, Wisconsin, U.S.	
42	Win	34–2–6	Kid Beebe	PTS	10	Apr 24, 1908	Green Valley A.C., Milwaukee, Wisconsin, U.S.	
41	Loss	33–2–6	Owen Moran	NWS	6	Apr 7, 1908	National A.C., New York City, New York, U.S.	
40	Win	33–1–6	Jack Redmond	PTS	6	Mar 30, 1908	Green Valley A.C., Milwaukee, Wisconsin, U.S.	
39	Win	32–1–6	Harry Baker	PTS	10	Feb 14, 1908	Green Valley A.C., Milwaukee, Wisconsin, U.S.	
38	Win	31–1–6	Jack Nolan	KO	1 (?)	Jan 18, 1908	Star Theater, Milwaukee, Wisconsin, U.S.	
37	Win	30–1–6	Willie Sullivan	TKO	5 (?)	Jan 17, 1908	Milwaukee Boxing Club, Milwaukee, Wisconsin, U.S.	
36	Win	29–1–6	Buck Plotell	KO	5 (?)	Jan 1, 1908	Saint Joseph, Missouri, U.S.	
35	Win	28–1–6	Ole Nelson	KO	1 (?)	Dec 30, 1907	Schlitz Park, Milwaukee, Wisconsin, U.S.	
34	Win	27–1–6	Biz Mackey	NWS	6	Nov 21, 1907	Coliseum, Davenport, Iowa, U.S.	
33	Draw	26–1–6	Frankie Conley	PTS	8	Oct 15, 1907	Green Valley A.C., Milwaukee, Wisconsin, U.S.	
32	Win	26–1–5	Irish Tom Landers	KO	5 (?)	Oct 10, 1907	Waukegan, Illinois, U.S.	
31	Win	25–1–5	Jeff O'Connell	PTS	15	Sep 15, 1907	Saint Joseph, Missouri, U.S.	
30	Win	24–1–5	Frankie Conley	PTS	8	Sep 10, 1907	Green Valley A.C., Milwaukee, Wisconsin, U.S.	
29	Draw	23–1–5	Jeff O'Connell	PTS	6	Aug 23, 1907	Racine, Wisconsin, U.S.	
28	Win	23–1–4	Danny Goodman	TKO	4 (?)	Jun 28, 1907	Hippodrome, Milwaukee, Wisconsin, U.S.	
27	Draw	22–1–4	Percy Cove	PTS	8	Jun 12, 1907	Armory B, Oshkosh, Wisconsin, U.S.	
26	Win	22–1–3	Young Morris	TKO	4 (?)	May 25, 1907	Star B.C., Milwaukee, Wisconsin, U.S.	
25	Win	21–1–3	Buddy Glover	TKO	7 (?)	May 21, 1907	Fond du Lac, Wisconsin, U.S.	
24	Win	20–1–3	Tom Campbell	PTS	15	Apr 30, 1907	Saint Joseph, Missouri, U.S.	
23	Draw	19–1–3	Jack Redmond	PTS	6	Apr 13, 1907	Star B.C., Milwaukee, Wisconsin, U.S.	
22	Win	19–1–2	Jeff O'Connell	PTS	6	Apr 9, 1907	Green Valley A.C., Milwaukee, Wisconsin, U.S.	
21	Win	18–1–2	Kid Brady	KO	1 (?)	Mar 29, 1907	Eagle A.C., Milwaukee, Wisconsin, U.S.	
20	Draw	17–1–2	Buck Plotell	PTS	15	Mar 19, 1907	Eagles Club, Saint Joseph, Missouri, U.S.	
19	Win	17–1–1	Buddy Glover	DQ	3 (?)	Mar 15, 1907	Milwaukee Boxing Club, Milwaukee, Wisconsin, U.S.	
18	Win	16–1–1	Jack Nolan	PTS	6	Mar 12, 1907	Green Valley A.C., Milwaukee, Wisconsin, U.S.	
17	Win	15–1–1	Kid Morgan	KO	2 (?)	Mar 1, 1907	Fond du Lac, Wisconsin, U.S.	
16	Draw	14–1–1	Jack Nolan	PTS	6	Feb 12, 1907	Green Valley A.C., Milwaukee, Wisconsin, U.S.	
15	Win	14–1	Gene McGovern	PTS	6	Feb 1, 1907	Badger A.C., Milwaukee, Wisconsin, U.S.	
14	Win	13–1	Johnny DeForest	KO	5 (?)	Nov 15, 1906	Lansing, Michigan, U.S.	
13	Win	12–1	Peter Kelly	KO	3 (?)	Oct 19, 1906	Grand Rapids, Michigan, U.S.	
12	Win	11–1	Young Mitchell	KO	3 (?)	Oct 15, 1906	Grand Rapids, Michigan, U.S.	
11	Win	10–1	Young Kilrain	KO	5 (?)	Sep 29, 1906	Grand Rapids, Michigan, U.S.	
10	Win	9–1	Kid Cannon	PTS	6	Sep 13, 1906	Grand Rapids, Michigan, U.S.	
9	Win	8–1	Ed Smith	KO	7 (?)	Sep 3, 1906	Petoskey, Michigan, U.S.	
8	Win	7–1	Charles Morgan	PTS	4	Aug 11, 1906	Godfrey's Theatre, Grand Rapids, Michigan, U.S.	
7	Win	6–1	Ted Smith	PTS	4	Aug 9, 1906	Grand Rapids, Michigan, U.S.	
6	Win	5–1	Kid Bond	KO	4 (4)	Aug 6, 1906	Godfrey's Theatre, Grand Rapids, Michigan, U.S.	
5	Win	4–1	Art Dietrich	KO	3 (?)	Aug 4, 1906	Godfrey's Theatre, Grand Rapids, Michigan, U.S.	
4	Win	3–1	Young Kilrain	PTS	4	Aug 3, 1906	Grand Rapids, Michigan, U.S.	
3	Loss	2–1	Eddie Nelson	PTS	4	Jul 12, 1906	Powers' Opera House, Grand Rapids, Michigan, U.S.	
2	Win	2–0	Eddie Nelson	KO	3 (4)	Jun 28, 1906	Powers' Opera House, Grand Rapids, Michigan, U.S.	
1	Win	1–0	Kid Moore	PTS	6	Jun 10, 1906	Petoskey, Michigan, U.S.	

== See also ==
- Lineal championship

Achievements
Preceded by Battling Nelson	World Lightweight Champion; 10 February 1910 – 28 November 1912	Succeeded by Willie Ritchie
