= Vernon Arena =

20th-century California boxing venue

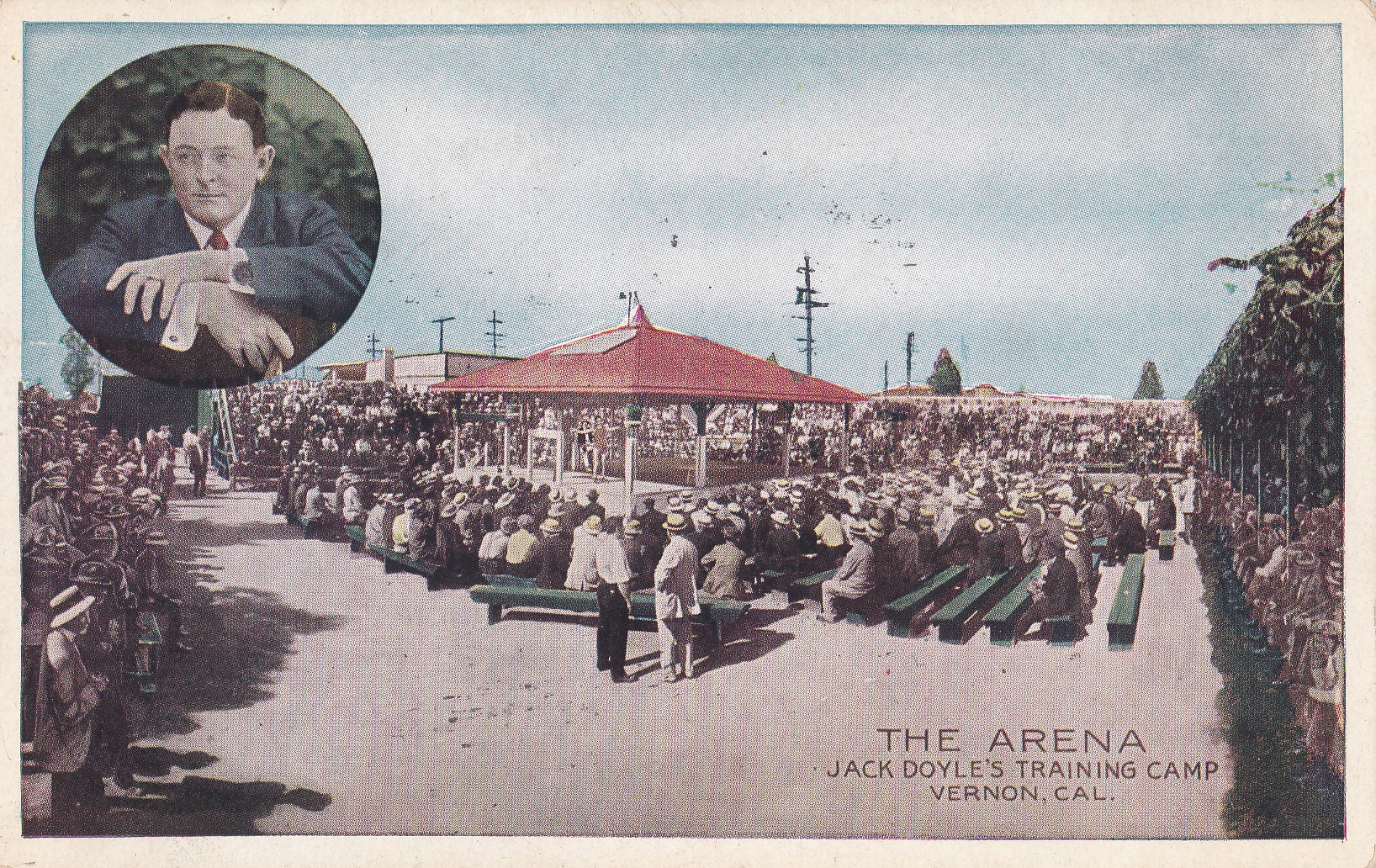
- Ring at Jack Doyle's club, Vernon, California (George Rice & Sons printers, Los Angeles, c. 1916, scanned by Catherine Johnson from personal collection)
- Interactive map of the Vernon Arena area
- Alternative names: Vernon Coliseum, Vernon Club, Jeffries' Vernon Arena, Jack Doyle's Training Camp, Doyle's Vernon Arena, Vernon Athletic Club

General information
- Location: Santa Fe & 26th (McCarey era), S Santa Fe Ave & E 38th St (Doyle era), Vernon, California
- Coordinates: 34.0081°N 118.2302°W (Doyle era)

The Vernon Arena, located just south of downtown Los Angeles, California, was a major early 20th-century west coast of the United States boxing venue. For much of its history the Vernon Arena was a "pavilion"—an outdoor boxing ring surrounded by seating for spectators—but the Vernon Coliseum, which stood from 1924 to 1927, was an indoor arena with capacity to host about 8,000 people.

== History ==
Vernon Arena is largely significant because of the work of two fight promoters: "Uncle Tom" McCarey and Jack Doyle.

=== Jefferies, Long & McCarey era ===
The original Vernon boxing "pavilion" was constructed by boxer Jim Jeffries and ubiquitous West Coast hotel-restaurant-club impresario Baron Long around 1908. Jeffries himself refereed some of the first fights at the venue, although Vernon fights were not financially successful under Jefferies.

The first Vernon boxing arena was being leased by McCarey from owner Jeffries when it caught fire and burned on September 16, 1911. A newspaper profile of McCarey published 1913 reported that he had "controlled the boxing situation" in the city for a dozen years past. According to a history of California boxing, "The Jeffries Club staged a number of notable fights but finally succumbed to the stiffer competition of McCarey's downtown club and went out of business, the plant being taken over by McCarey and operated rather spasmodically for championship bouts for a while until he gave up the Naud Junction location entirely and confined his efforts to putting on 15, 20, and 25 round contests in the Vernon arena." McCarey's Vernon arena was located at 26th and Santa Fe. McCarey departed Los Angeles for New Orleans in December 1914, following the passage of 1914 California Proposition 20. The state of California banned prize fighting (temporarily as it turned out) effective January 1, 1915. The Vernon arena built by Long and Jeffries burned in October 1915.

=== Doyle era ===
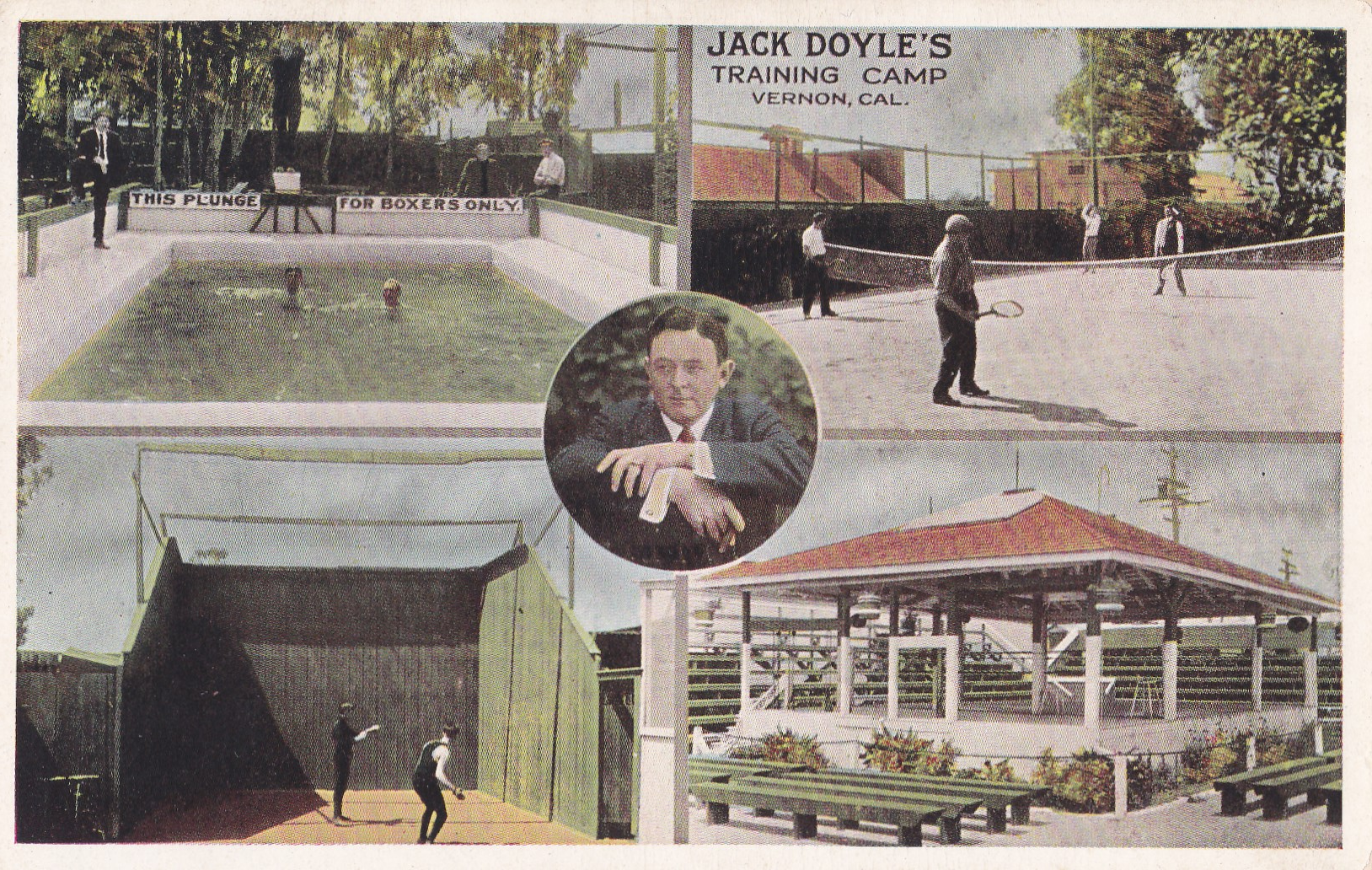
Training Areas - Jack Doyles Vernon CA (George Rice & Sons printers, Los Angeles, c. 1916)

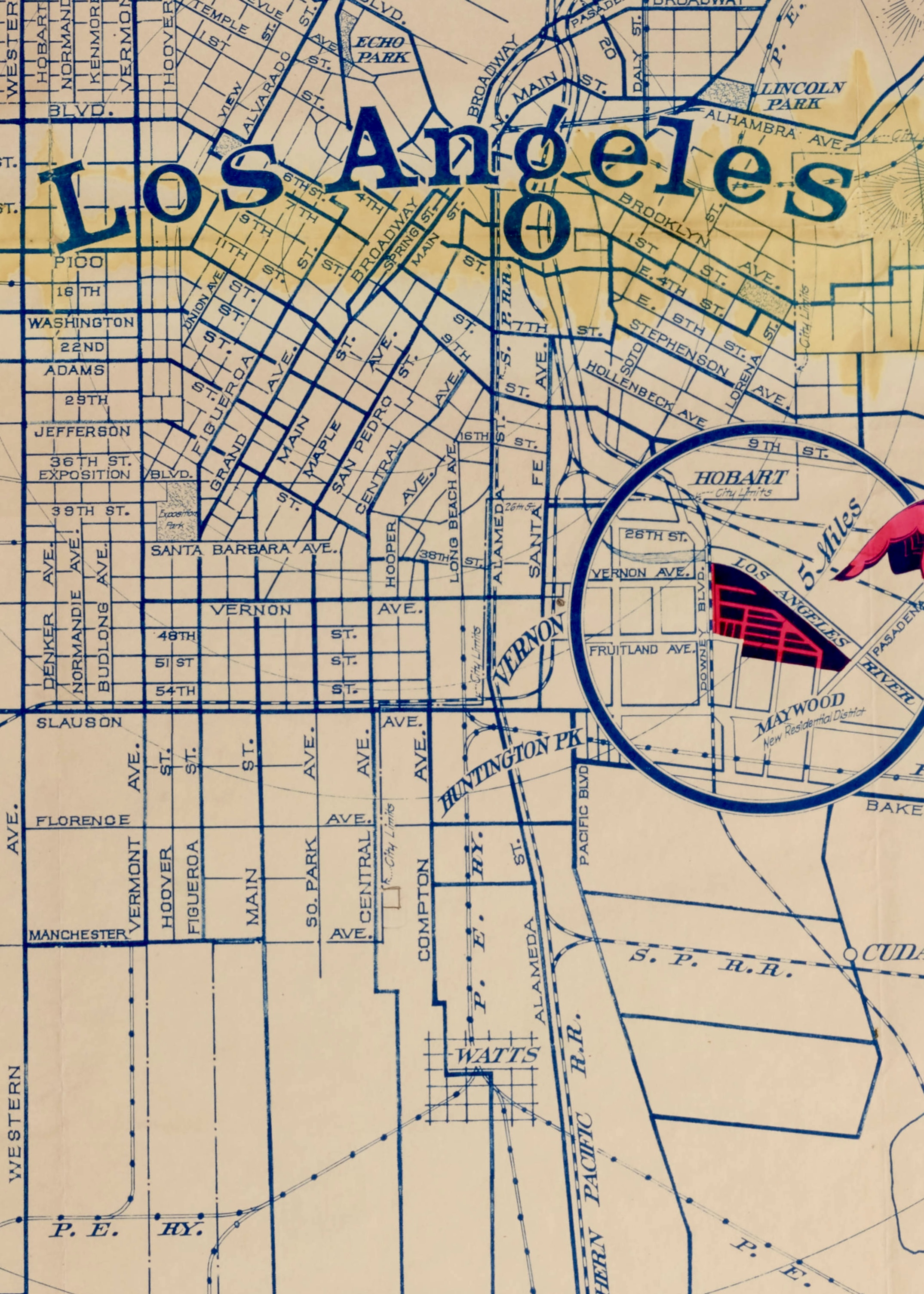
Promotional map for Los Angeles Central Manufacturing District showing rail lines and streets in Vernon in 1923

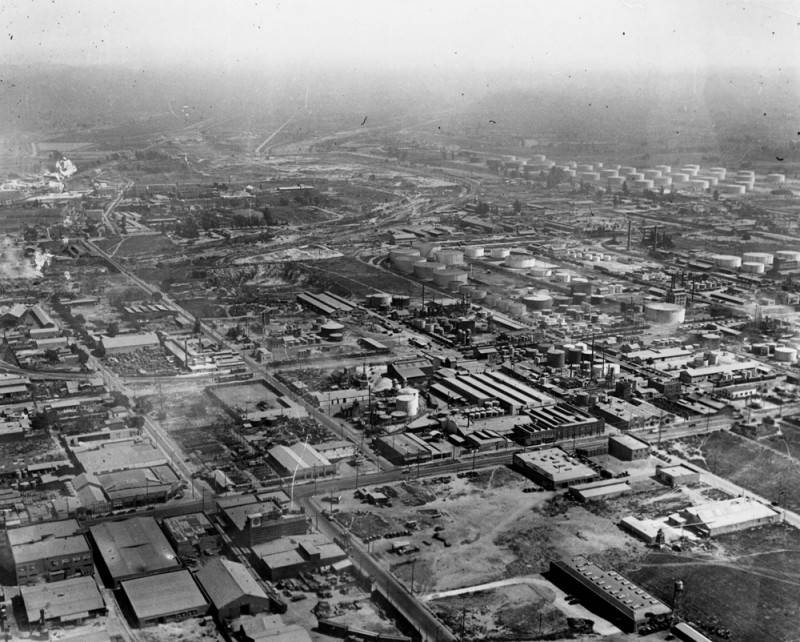
Aerial view of Vernon in 1925, looking northeast near Santa Fe and Vernon Avenue

In the late teens, Doyle replaced McCarey as Vernon's boss of boxing. Doyle had long run a famous bar in Vernon (the city was a wet enclave within dry Los Angeles). According to Los Angeles historian Cecilia Rasmussen, Doyle's first venture in Vernon was "a gigantic saloon, where 37 bartenders rang up liquor sales on 37 cash registers at a 100-foot-long bar. Behind it hung a sign—'If Your Children Need Shoes, Don't Buy Any Booze'—and in the ceiling were peepholes from which to keep an eye on the barmen, patrons, and pickpockets."

Doyle's bar closed in 1919 due to the national prohibition on the sale of alcohol, but he had already set up a training camp that was located out back, past the card room. The two-story hotel structure that a contractor reported he had completed at 38th and Santa Fe in June 1916 may have been the facility known as Jack Doyle's Training Camp. A show-business history published 1934 stated, "All the big fighters of the day, as well as preliminary boys, has-beens, and hope-to-bes, trained at Jack Doyle's camp. The crowds that gathered to watch were drawn from what reporters are wont to call 'all walks of life.' There were pickpockets, fences, promoters, and we-boys. Also there were such celebrities as Earl Rogers, famed criminal attorney and father of Adela Rogers St. Johns, Mr. and Mrs. Jack Cudahy, Anita Baldwin, and the entire movie crowd." According to boxer-actor-trainer Dewitt Van Court, "The camp was patronized by the finest boxers in the land and their popularity drew such huge crowds, particularly on Sundays, that Doyle had to erect a regular arena and surround it with stands which would accommodate several hundred people. To pay for the stands, Doyle charged a nominal admission, and the crowds grew so large that he finally enlarged it to seat several thousand and roofed it over."

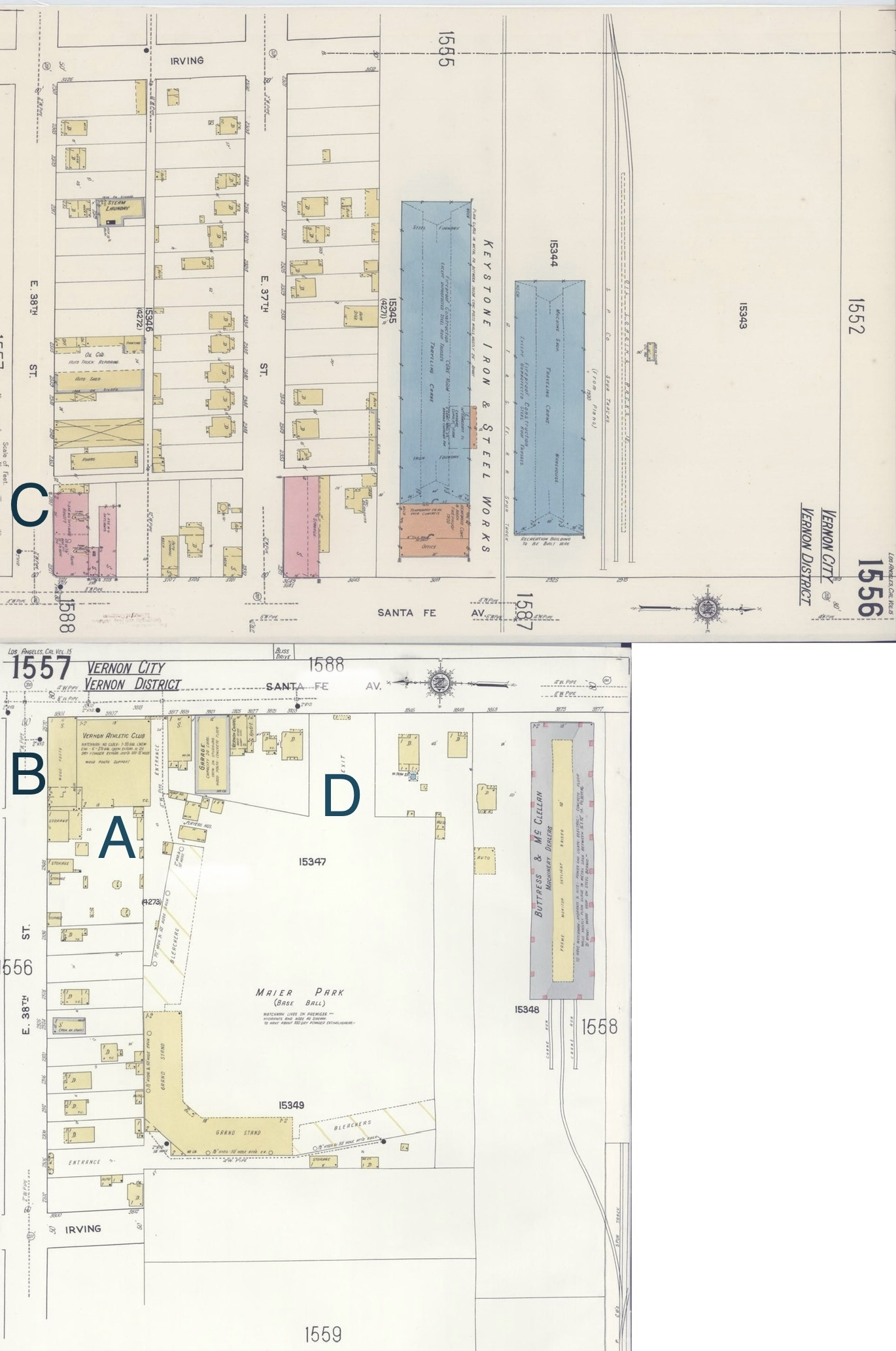
This is the 1920 Sanborn Fire Insurance Co. map of Vernon; per research by California boxing expert Catherine Johnson: (A) The Vernon Athletic Club was originally just a tent-top boxing ring but later became an enclosed athletic club and boxing venue. The Vernon Coliseum later extended past the footprint of the original building. (B) Marked as "wood posts" on the Sanborn map, this was Doyle's Saloon. (C) Upper left, the space in the pink building marked "restaurant" was Doyle's Café to feed visiting fight fans, and the yellow building perpendicular and above marked "Rooms" became the Stag Hotel, to house fighters. (D) Maier Field, also known as Vernon Ballpark, was occasionally dressed and used as a boxing venue for especially popular fights.

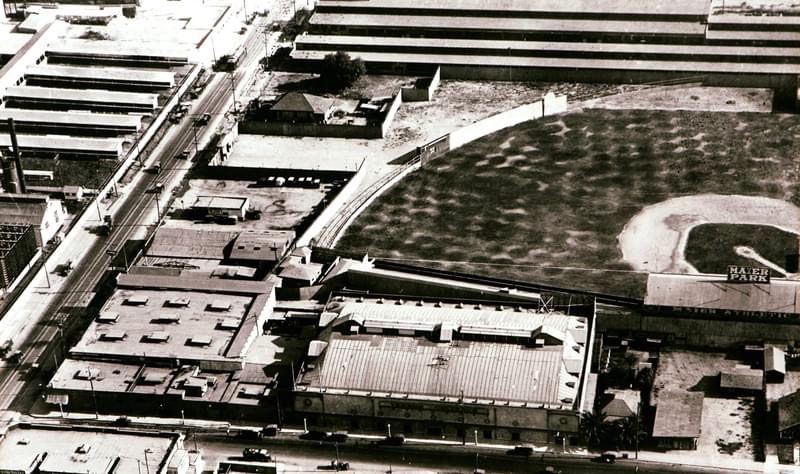
Aerial view of Vernon Arena and Maier Park fronting 38th Street c. 1925

Doyle's Vernon Arena became the center of boxing in Los Angeles. According to the Los Angeles Times, "With 'Wad' Wadhams as matchmaker, seven four-round bouts were staged at the Doyle Arena every Tuesday night from 1916 to 1923." With prizefighting illegal, the fighters were officially all "amateurs" engaged in "exhibition" matches. The prizes were medals and "maybe a little 'expense' money". In 1921 fight tickets were priced $1 to $3, and there was a section of the arena reserved for ladies. The last fight at Doyle's original outdoor arena was held August 21, 1923.

=== Doyle's "Coliseum" ===
Doyle began planning an indoor arena as early as 1920, intending for a building that fronted on 38th Street "near the north entrance of Maier park [with] a frontage of 160 feet and a depth of 138 feet." Doyle's Vernon Coliseum, as he called it, was opened August 28, 1923, with capacity for 8,000 spectators. With the passage of California Proposition 7, prizefighting was made legal again. In the interim between the passage of Prop 7 and January 13, 1925, the date of the first fight under the new law, a planned 10-round bout between Jimmy McLarnin and Fidel LaBarba, Doyle added another 2,000 seats to the coliseum. Promoter Jack Doyle moved his operation to the Olympic Auditorium in autumn 1926. The indoor arena was destroyed in a fire on July 23, 1927. The fire started in a neighboring "sawdust and shavings" mill, and also destroyed the grandstand of the Maier Park stadium where the Vernon Tigers had once played baseball.

== Additional images ==
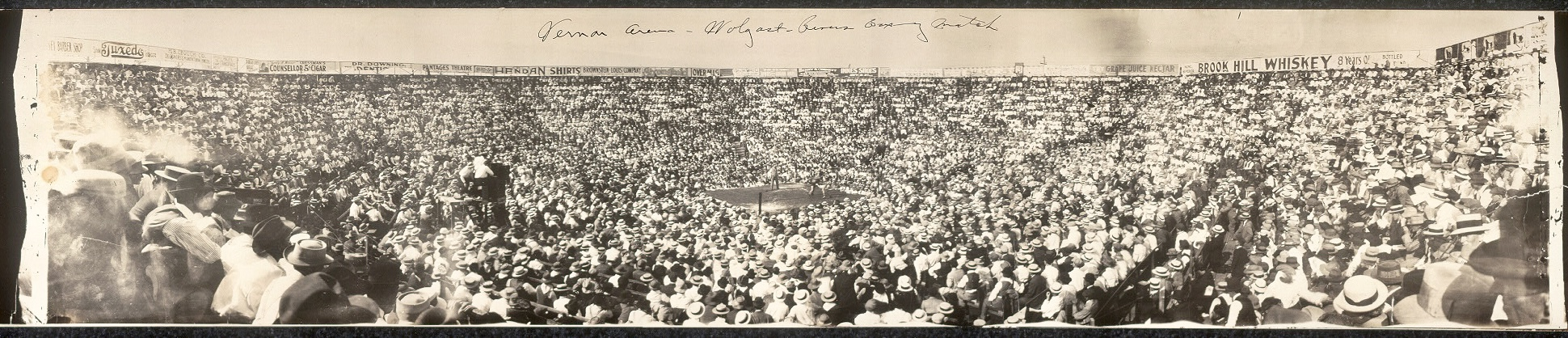
Panoramic photo of Wolgast–Rivers boxing match, July 4, 1912: "There are thousands in Los Angeles who saw Ad Wolgast fight Joe Rivers in a never-to-be-forgotten battle at Vernon about nine years ago when both men were knocked out in the 13th round and Wolgast staggered to his feet first and was awarded the decision." The words "Vernon Arena" were written on the print but this is actually the Vernon baseball field—Jack Doyle "used the ballpark for the really big fights (Ad Wolgast was very popular) because he could cram more bodies in more seats".

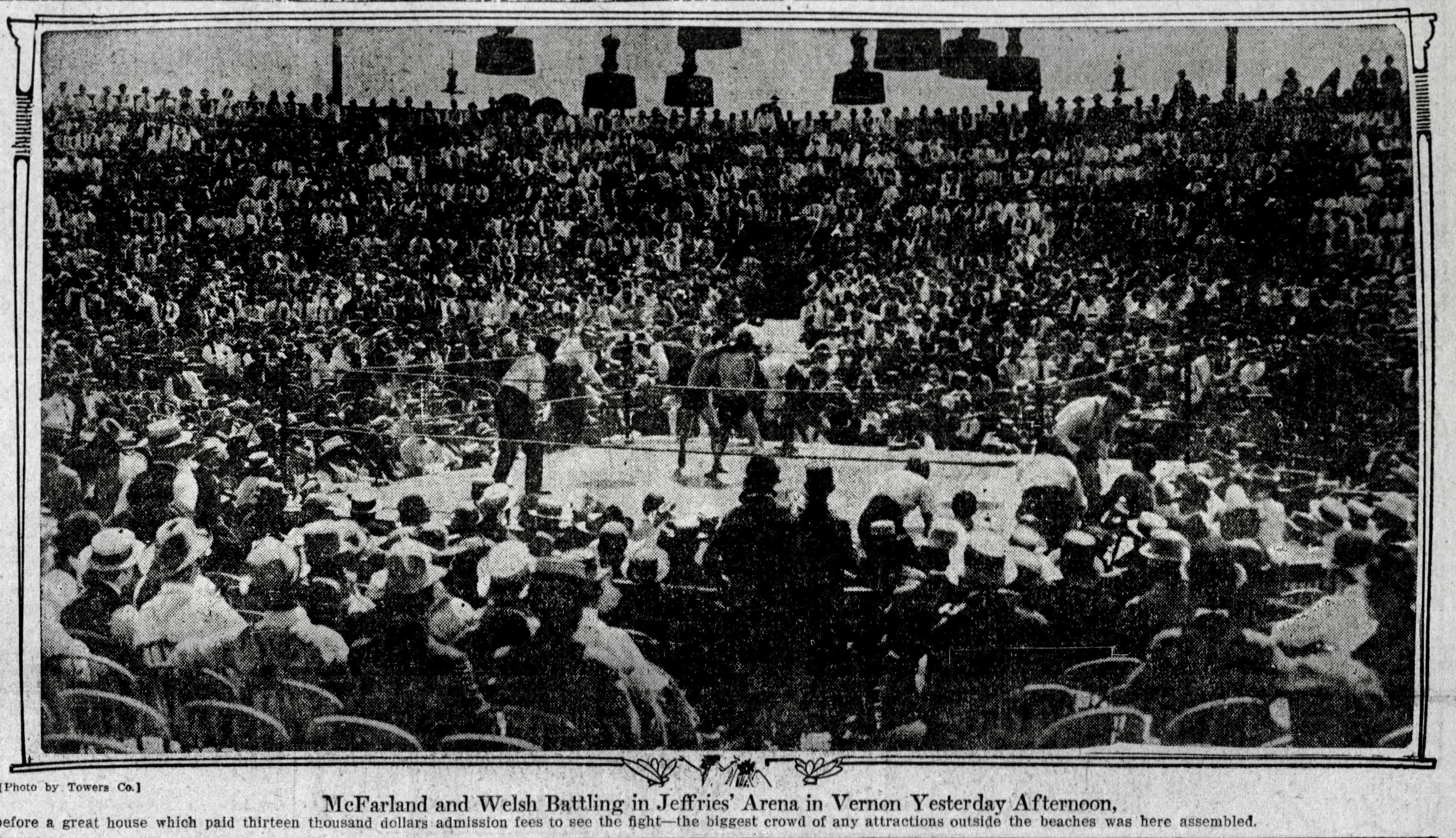
Packy McFarland versus Freddie Welsh, refereed by James J. Jeffries, at Jeffries' Vernon Arena, 1908

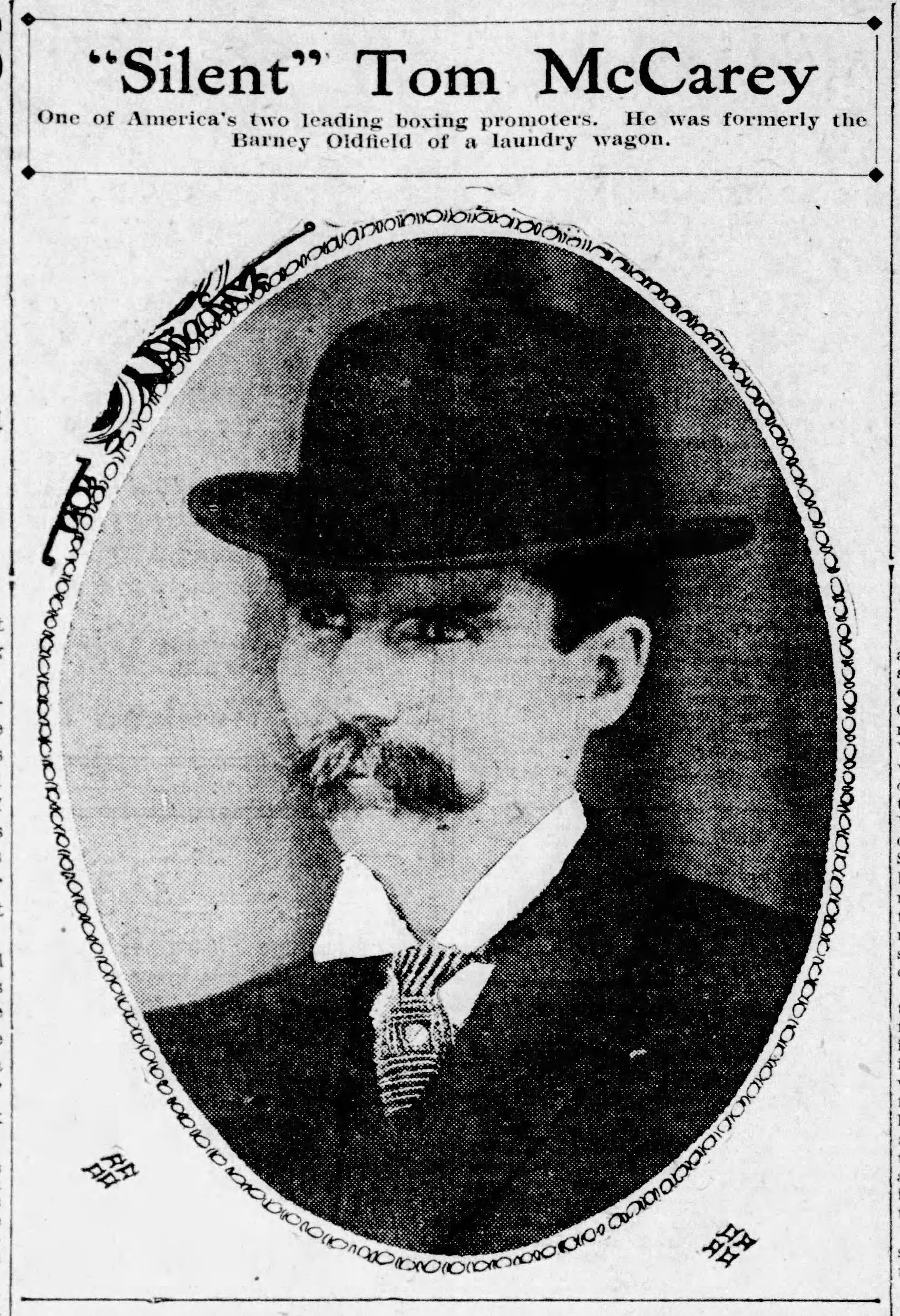
McCarey (S.F. Bulletin, 1913)

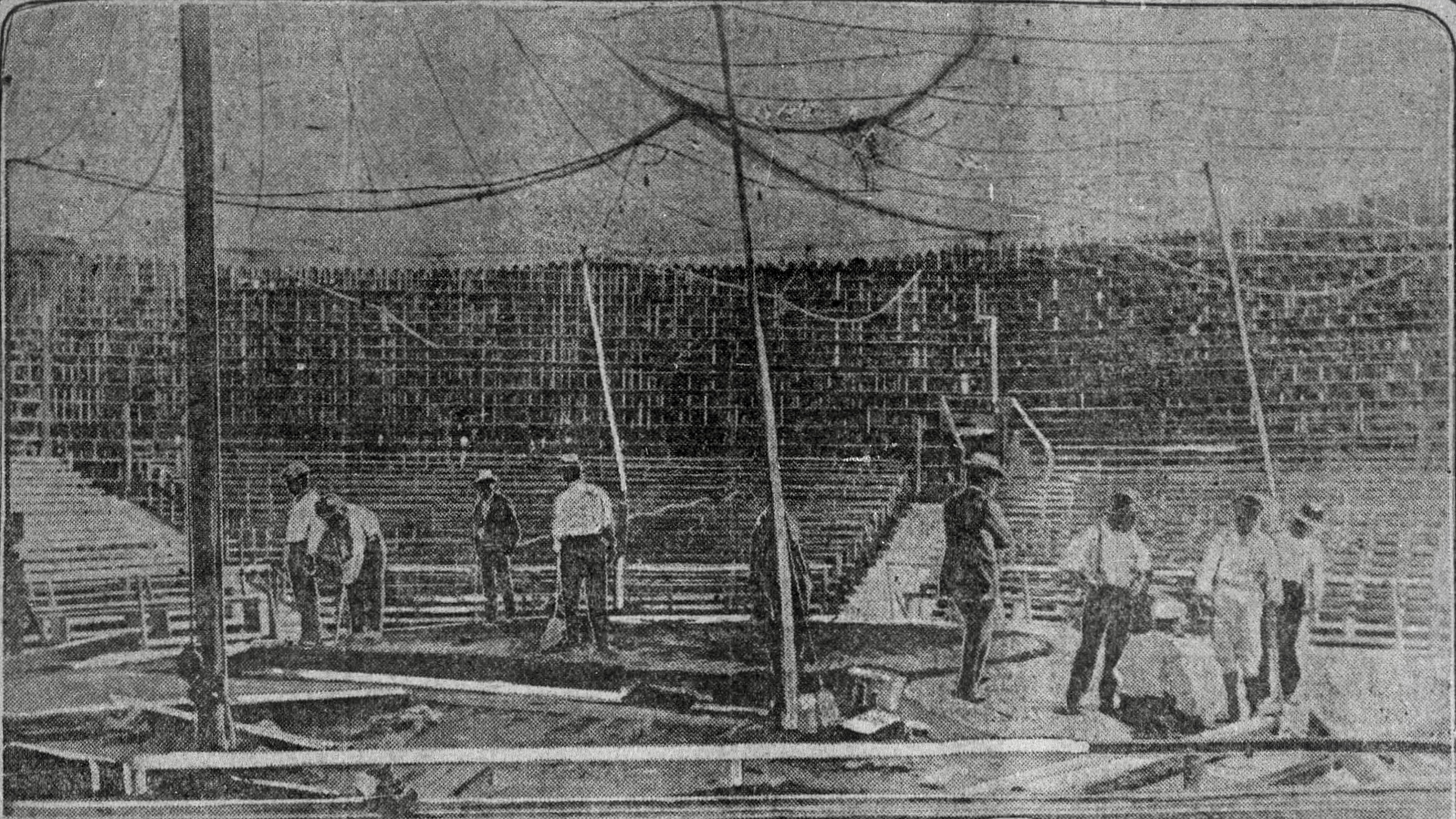
Prepping the Vernon arena for a "Japanese wrestling" exhibition (Los Angeles Times, September 4, 1915)

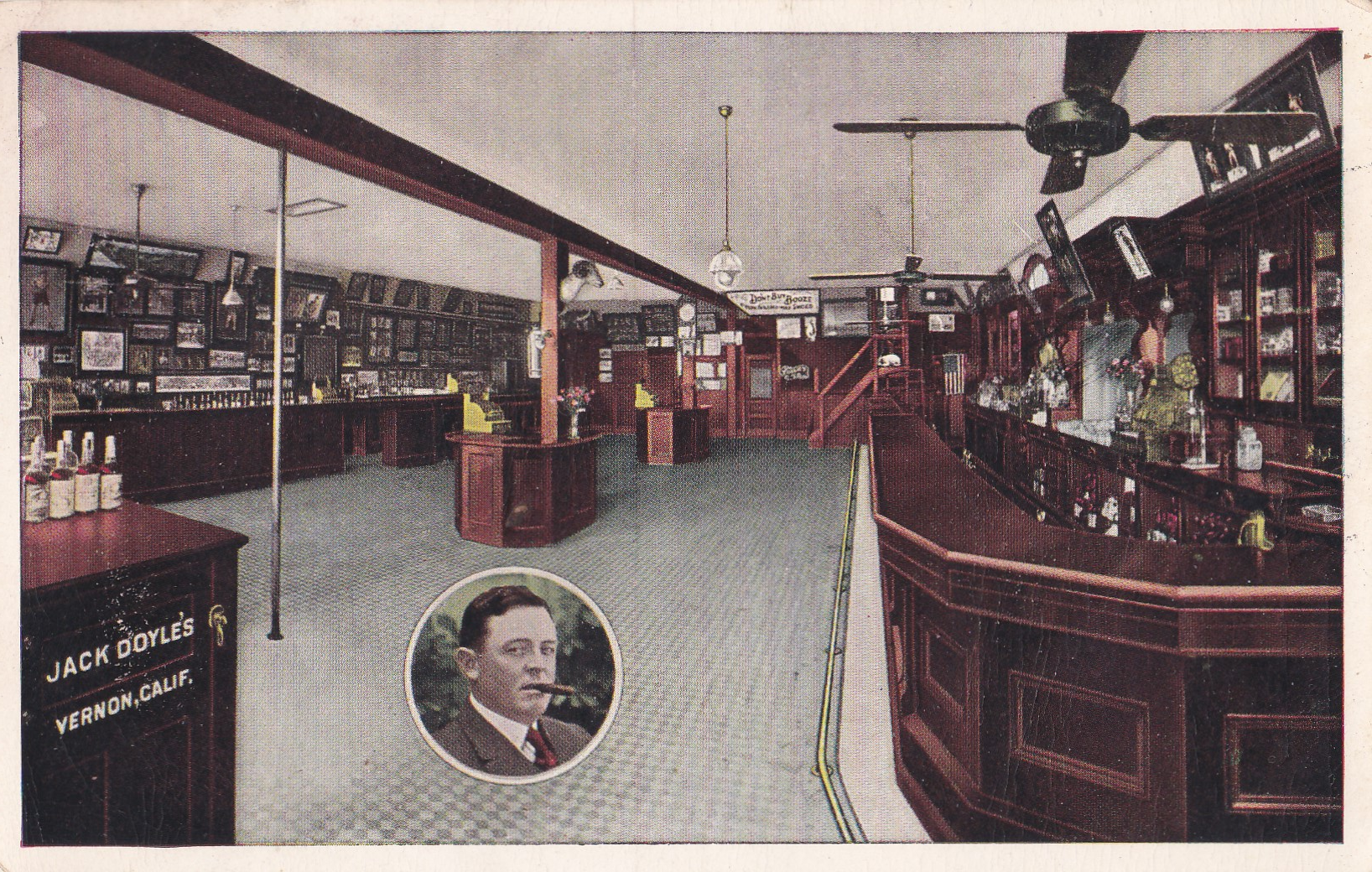
Central Saloon - Jack Doyles Vernon CA (George Rice & Sons printers, Los Angeles, c. 1916)

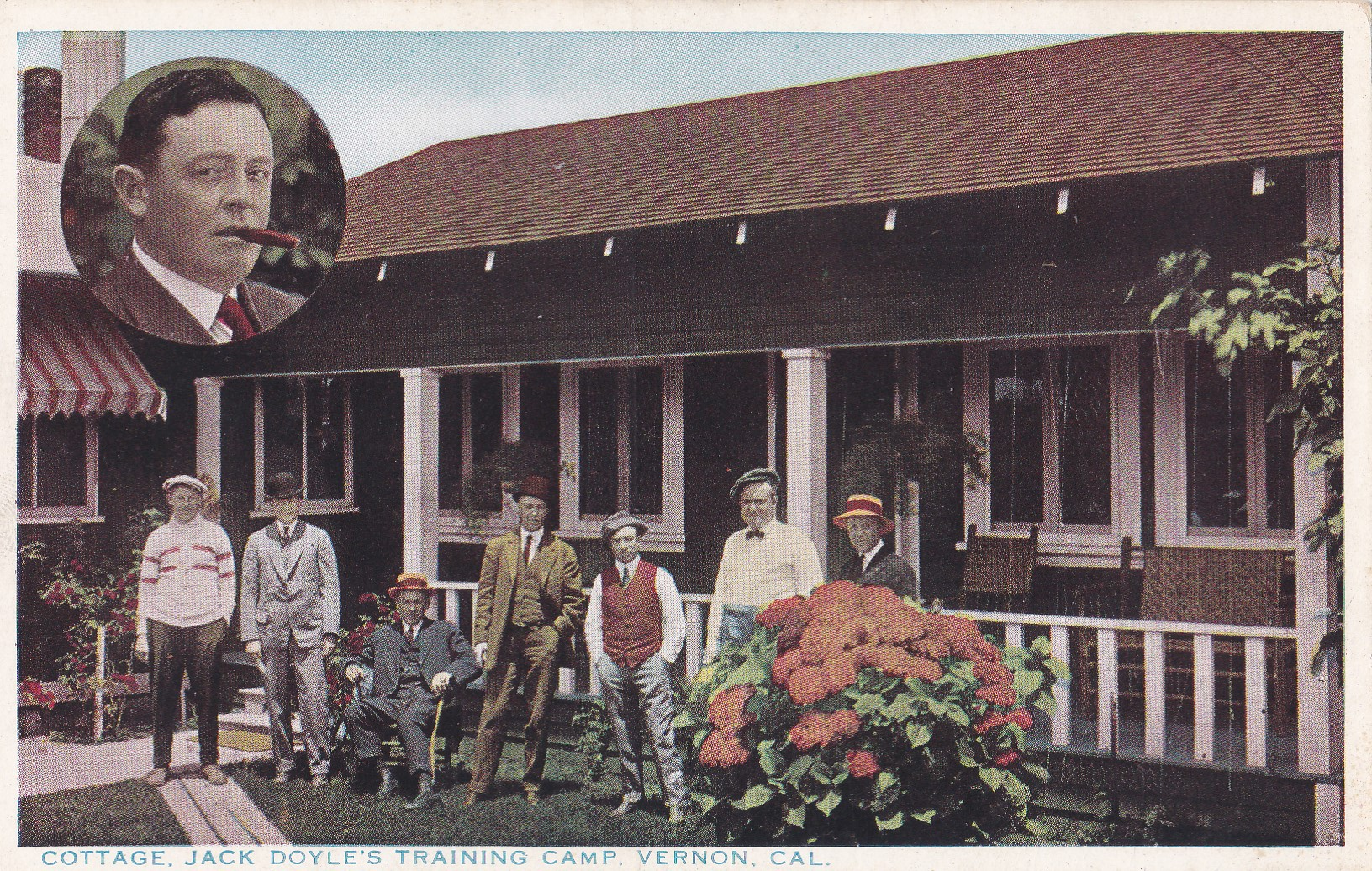
Fighters Cottages - Jack Doyles Vernon CA (c. 1916)

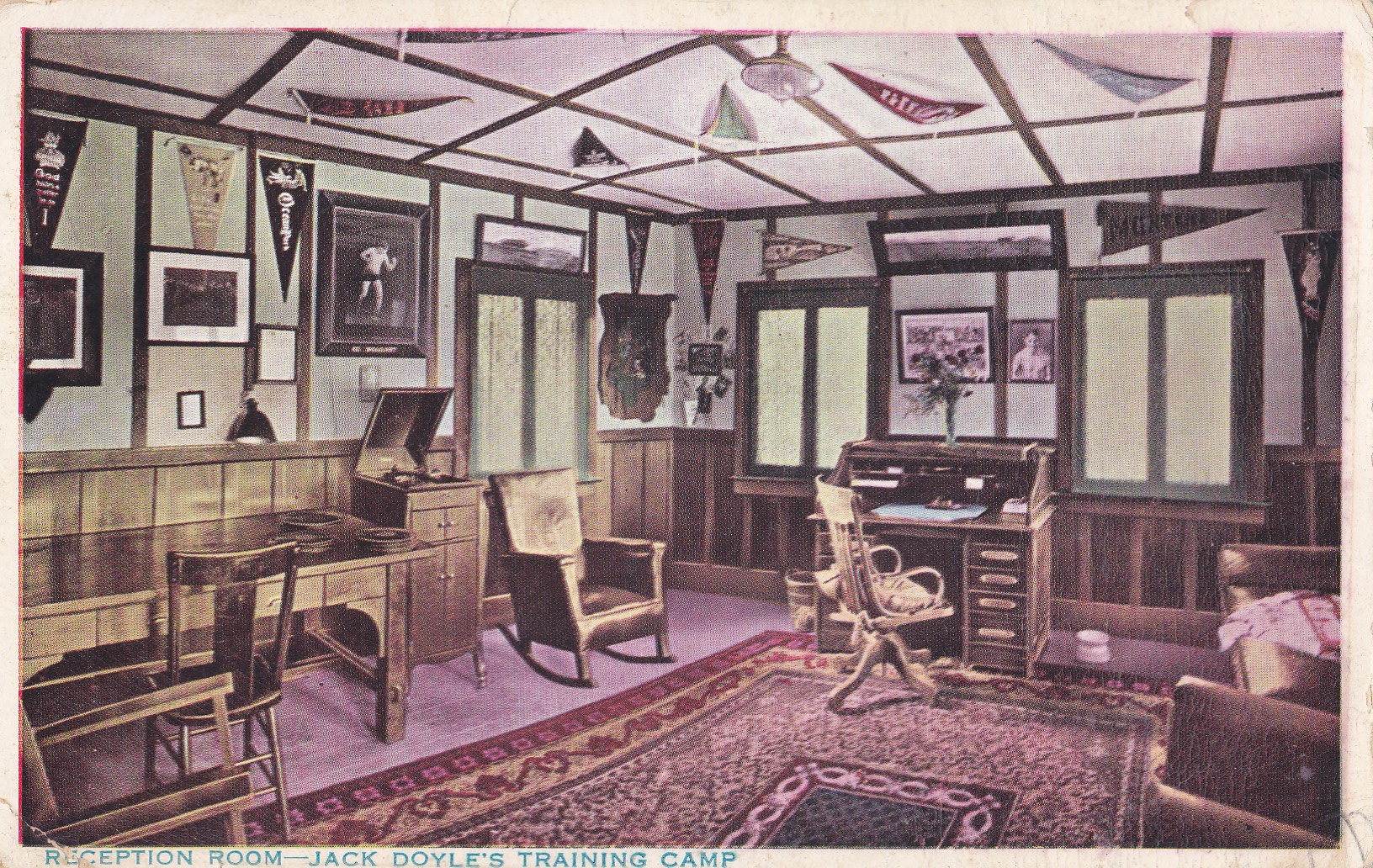
Reception Room - Jack Doyles Vernon CA (c. 1916)

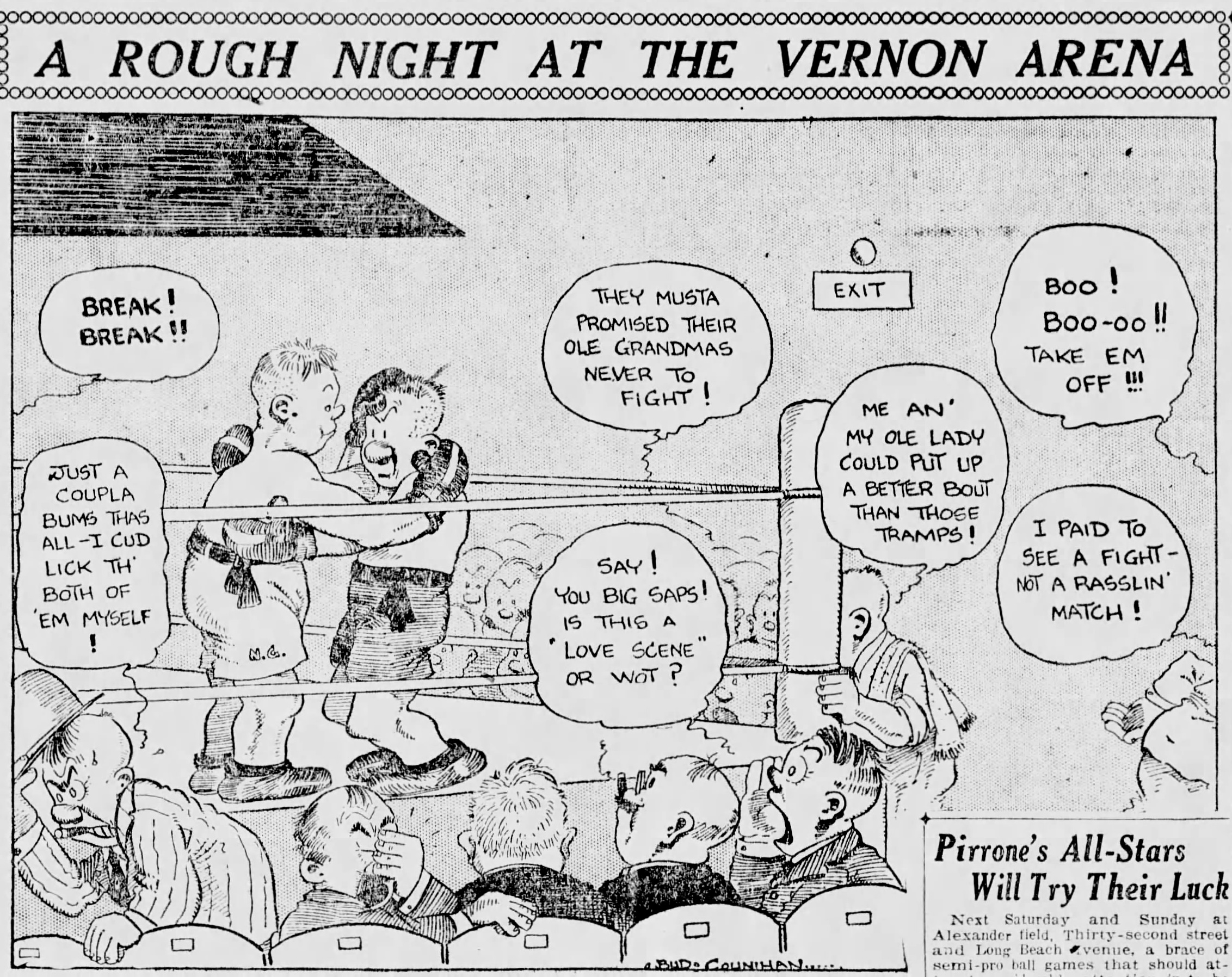
Bud Counihan comic (Los Angeles Times, August 3, 1921)

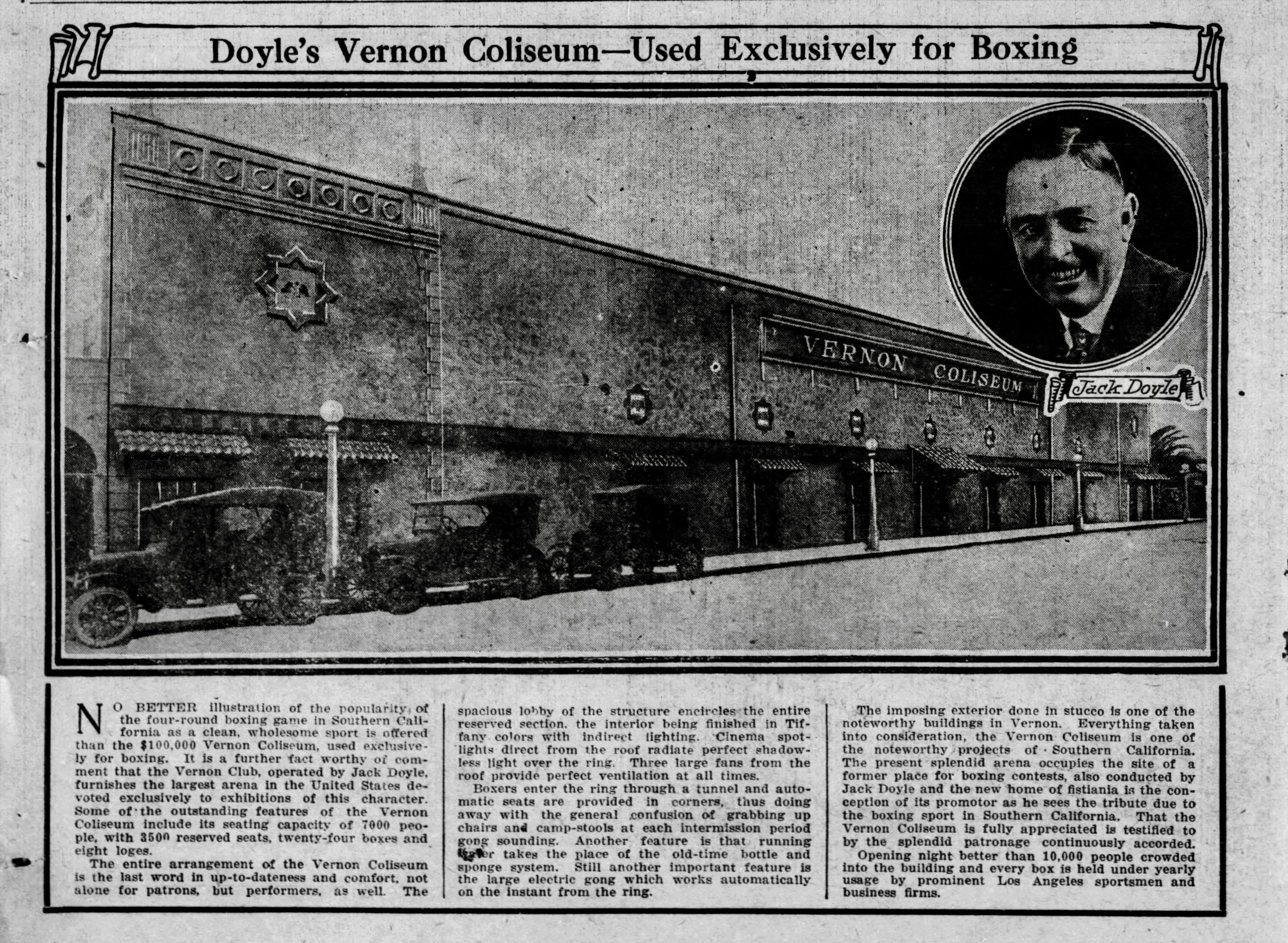
"Doyle's Vernon Coliseum—Used Exclusively for Boxing" (Los Angeles Times, January 1, 1925)

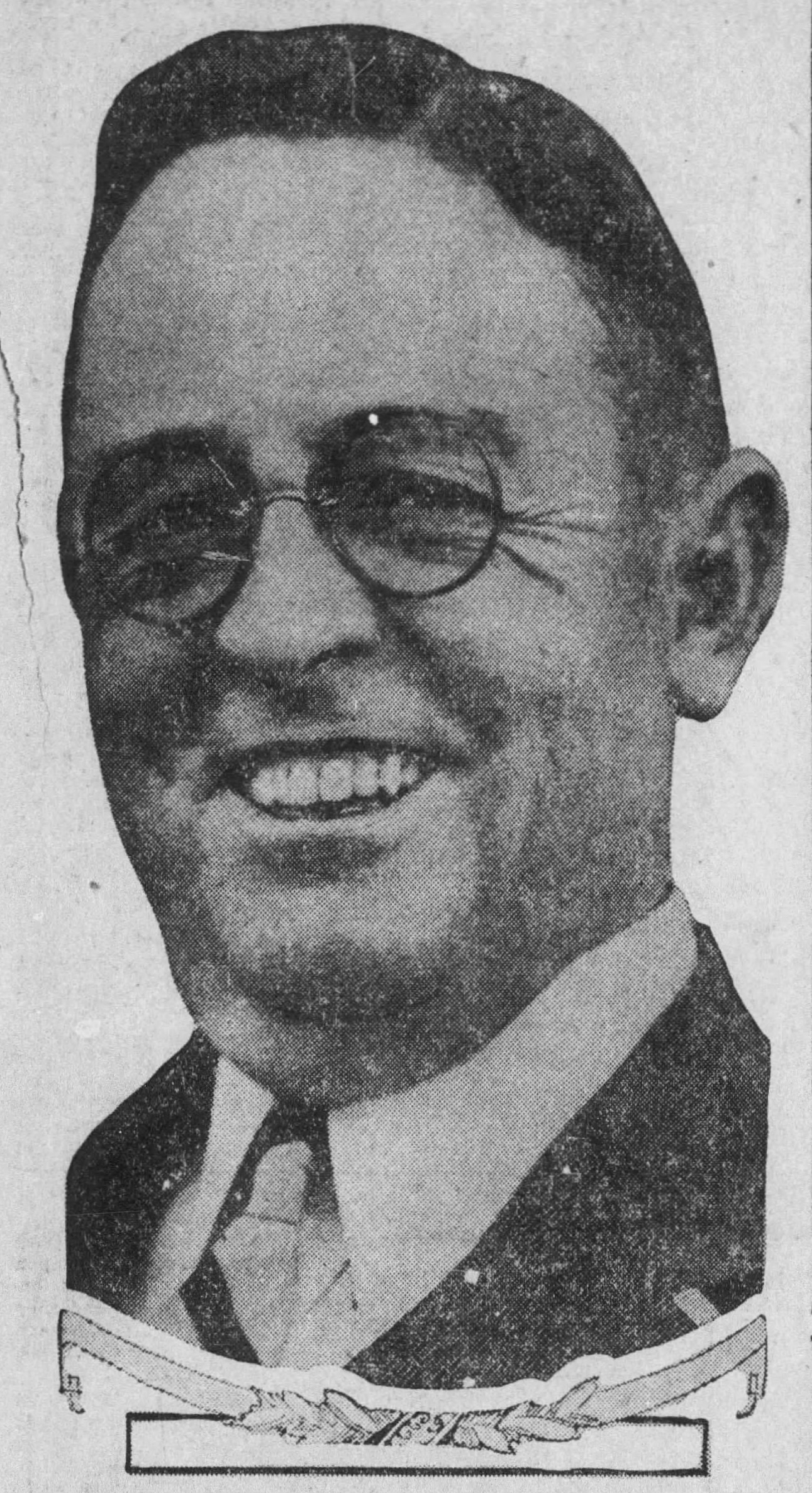
Doyle (L.A. Times, 1926)

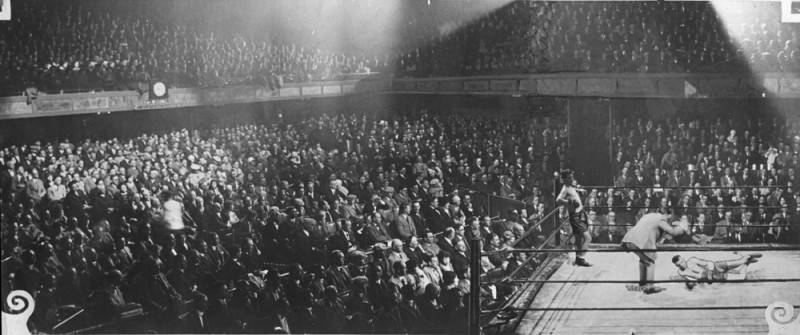
Hayden Phytian defeats Earl Little at Vernon Arena, possibly April 22, 1925

== See also ==
- Hazard's Pavilion
- Hollywood Legion Stadium
- Washington Park (Los Angeles)
- Harry Burns (filmmaker)
- Ship Cafe (Venice, California)
- Los Angeles Union Stock Yards
