= Frankie Conley =

Italian boxer

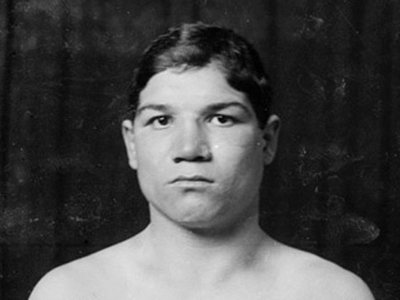
Conley in 1910

Frankie Conley (born Francesco Conte; October 4, 1890 – August 21, 1952) was a bantamweight boxing champion.

== Biography ==
He was born on October 4, 1890, in Platania, Calabria, Italy as Francesco Conte. He became the bantamweight boxing champion of the world when he knocked out Monte Attell in 42 rounds on February 22, 1910.

In 1912 he was knocked out by Mexican Joe Rivers.

He died on August 21, 1952, in Kenosha, Wisconsin.
