= Jack Doyle (boxing promoter) =

American businessman (1877–1944)

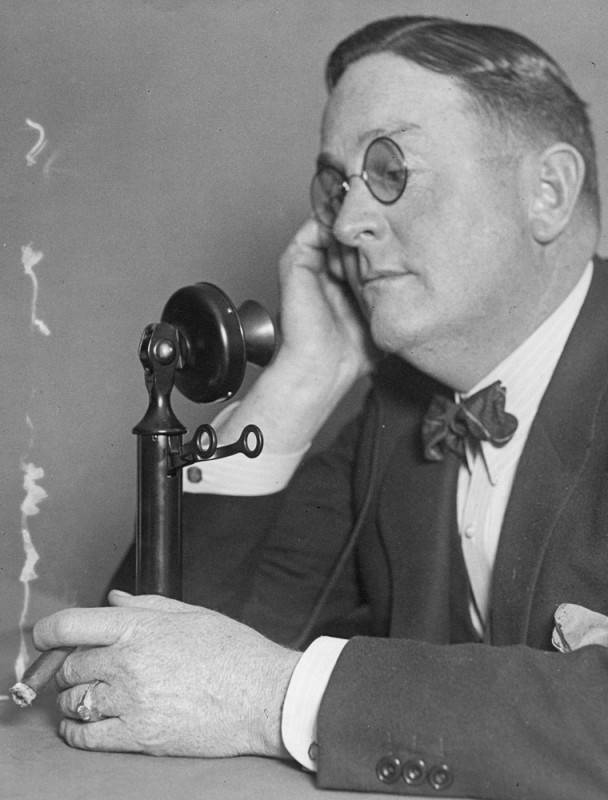
- Doyle in 1925 (Los Angeles Herald Examiner, September 28)
- Born: John Joseph Doyle; December 27, 1877; Oakland, California, U.S.
- Died: January 30, 1944 (aged 66); Santa Monica, California, U.S.

Jack Doyle (December 27, 1877 – January 30, 1944) was an American railroad engineer, saloon owner, boxing promoter, and oil-industry investor. In the 1910s he ran what was called the "longest bar in the world" in Vernon, California, United States. He was later instrumental in the creation of both the Vernon Coliseum and the Olympic Auditorium. He retired from fight promotion by 1932 and successfully transitioned to oil drilling at Signal Hill.

He also had a ranch in Kern County. His brother Thomas Doyle served in the California State Assembly. Doyle died in Santa Monica, California, in 1944 at the age of 66.

== Additional images ==
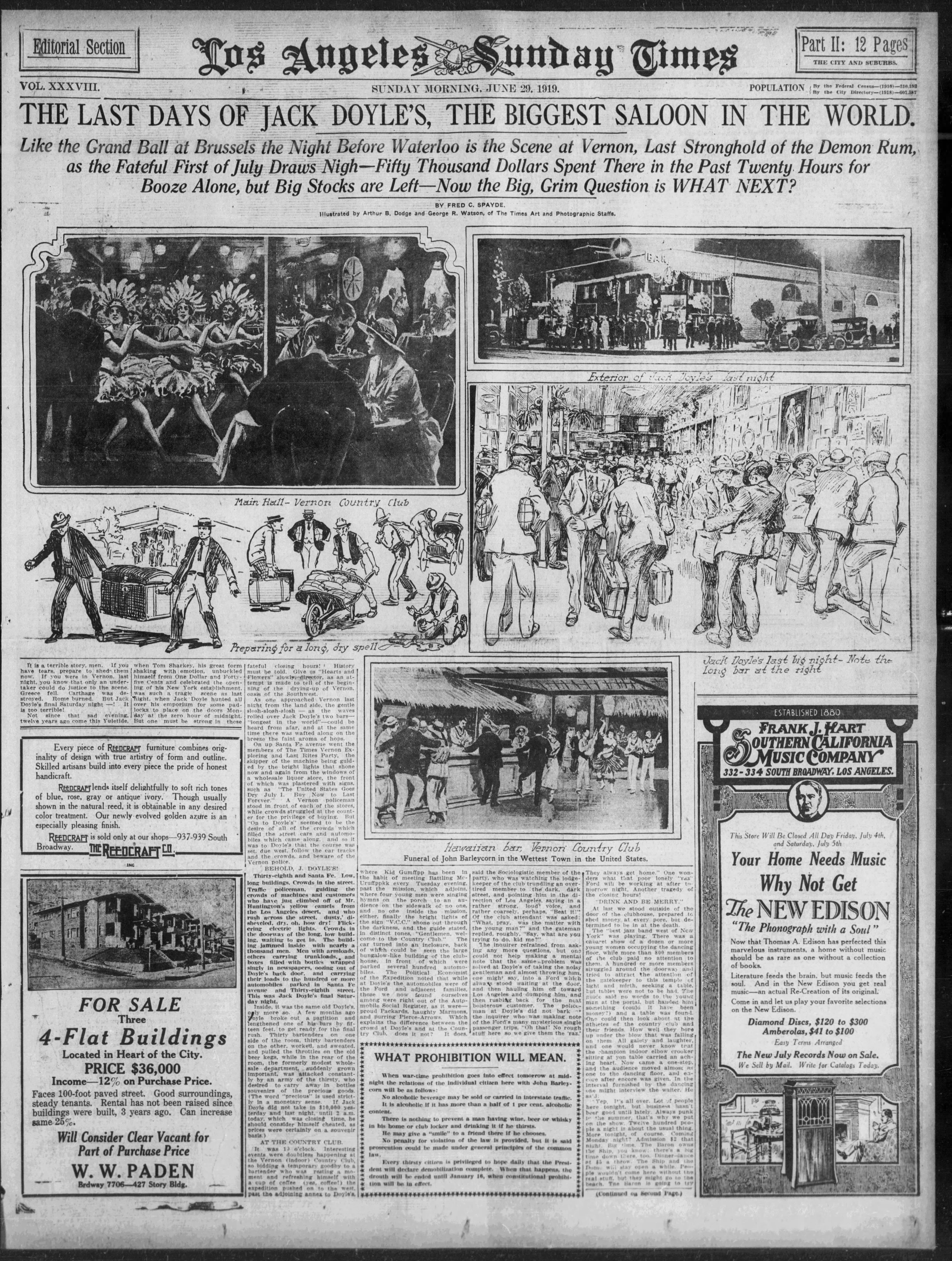
Just prior to the advent of Prohibition in 1919, the Los Angeles Times featured "The Last Days of Jack Doyle's, the Biggest Saloon in the World"

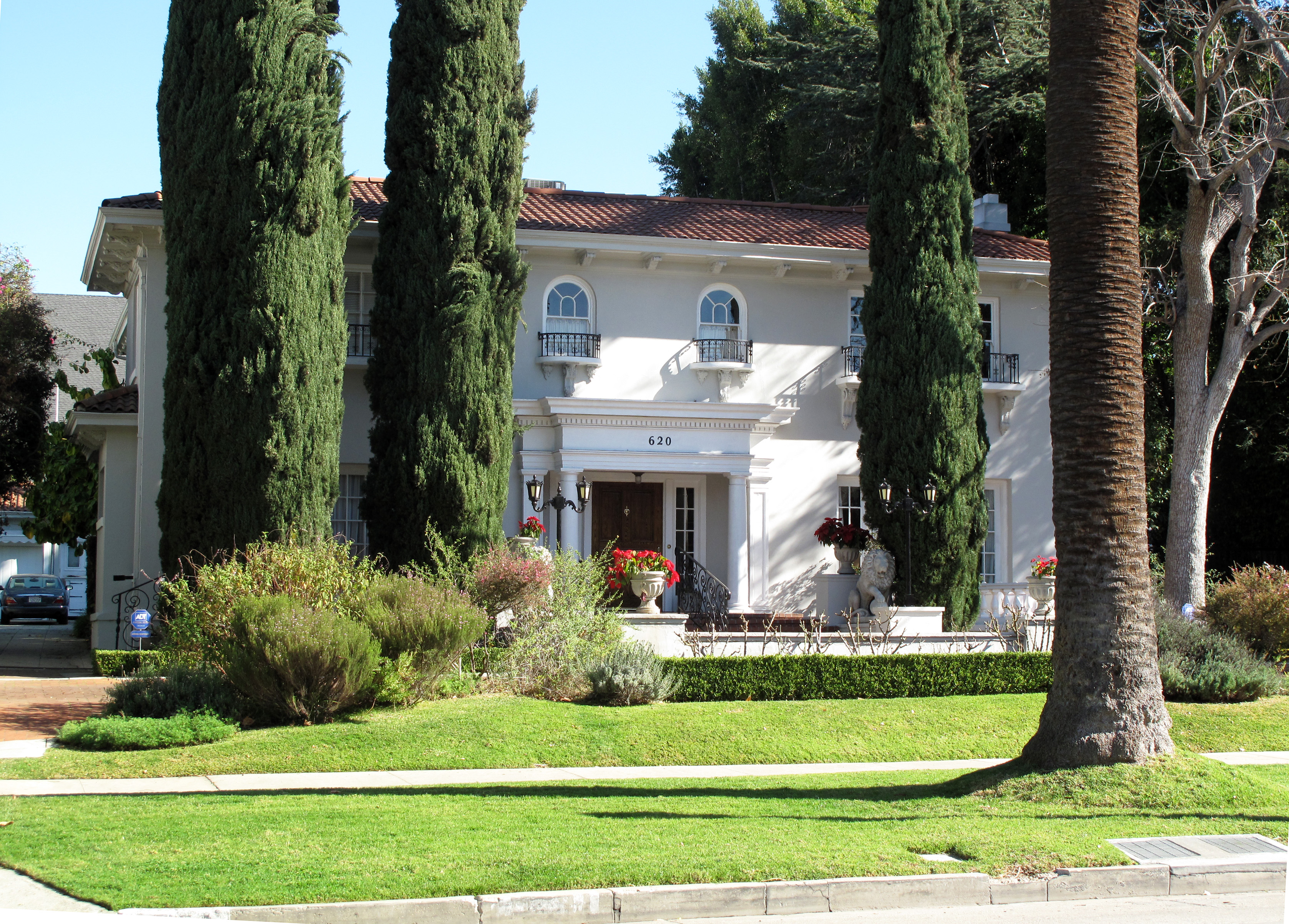
620 S. Irving in Windsor Square built for Doyle in 1919, is Los Angeles Historic-Cultural Landmark No. 628

== See also ==
- List of Los Angeles Historic-Cultural Monuments in the Wilshire and Westlake areas
