= Mexican Joe Rivers =

American boxer (1892–1957)

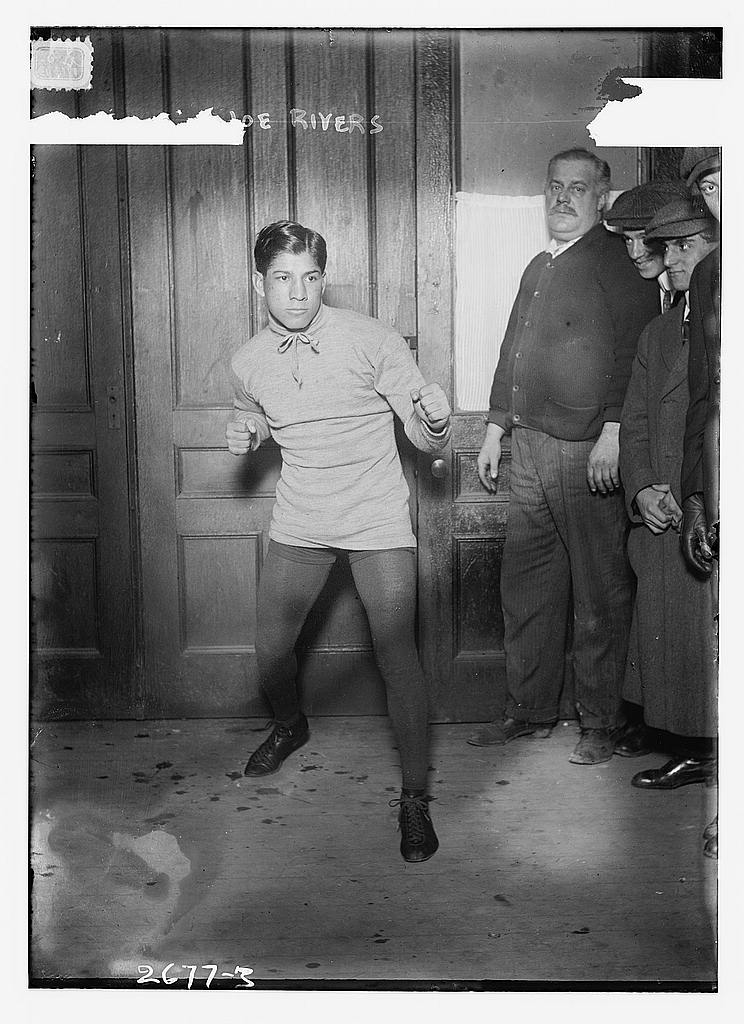
Rivers, demonstrating a fighting stance

Mexican Joe Rivers (born Jose Ybarra, March 19, 1892 – June 26, 1957) was an American boxer in the lightweight class whose ring career lasted from 1910 to 1923.

== Early life ==
Rivers was born in Los Angeles on March 19, 1892, to Andrew Ybarra and Mary Estrada. He was a fourth generation Californian. He was an indigenous American.

== Boxing Career ==
Rivers began performing under the last name Rivers after a ring announcer, failing to understand his last name, asked Rivers was from. As Rivers replied "down the river", the announcer opted to introduce him as Joe Rivers.

On February 22, 1911, he defeated Jimmy Reagan, a former Bantamweight World Champion by a technical knockout in the thirteenth round of a scheduled twenty. Reagan took a "terrific beating" and was knocked down four times prior to the thirteenth round. During the round, he was knocked down twice more by Rivers before the fight was called by the referee. The bout took place in the Vernon Arena in Vernon, California, in Los Angeles County. The referee was Charles Eyton.

Johnny Kilbane took on Rivers in 1911 and outboxed him in the twenty-round bout. A rematch also went to Kilbane. Rivers was described as 'a regular bear-cat scrapper, a hit-and-miss, hammer-and-tongs battler, who took a lot of stopping'.

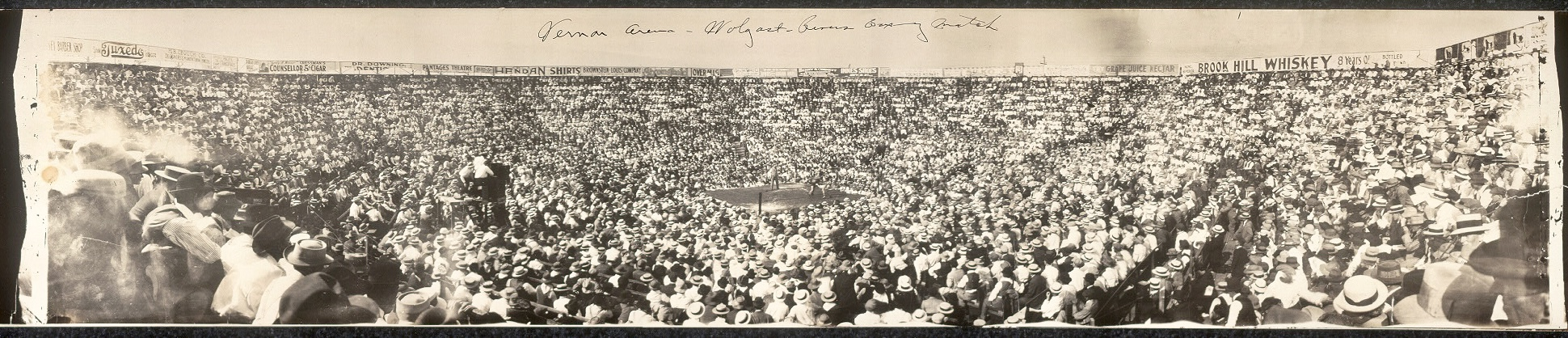
Panoramic photo of Wolgast–Rivers boxing match, July 4, 1912, at Vernon Arena

On January 1, 1912, he knocked out former World Bantameight Champion Frankie Conley. Around this time, Rivers was described "as fast as chain lightning, and a stinging puncher to boot", and one commentator claimed he was "probably the best youngster [Los Angeles has] turned out down that way."

On July 4, 1912, he fought Ad Wolgast for the lightweight title. At the beginning of the thirteenth round, he and Wolgast both landed punches that sent the other down. Wolgast fell on top of Rivers, and referee Jack Welch helped Wolgast to his feet and began the count on Rivers. Welch declared Wolgast the winner by a technical knockout, in a very controversial decision.

== Post- Career life ==
Rivers' father, Andrew Ybarra, died at aged 58 years on January 23, 1913, of tuberculosis. On March 1, 1913, Rivers married Pauline Slert of Santa Monica, California. Slert died in 1918 and Rivers remarried in 1924 to Opal Dean Case in Orange County, California.

Rivers was incorrectly reported to have died in 1918 after enlisting in World War I, when the SS Tuscania, a ship he was serving on, was torpedoed.

By 1955 he was living alone, in a windowless room on West Second Street in Los Angeles. His only possession of value was his father's 200-year-old violin, which he played daily.

He died on June 26, 1957, in Inglewood, California. He was buried in Calvary Cemetery in East Los Angeles.
