= Charley White =

English boxer

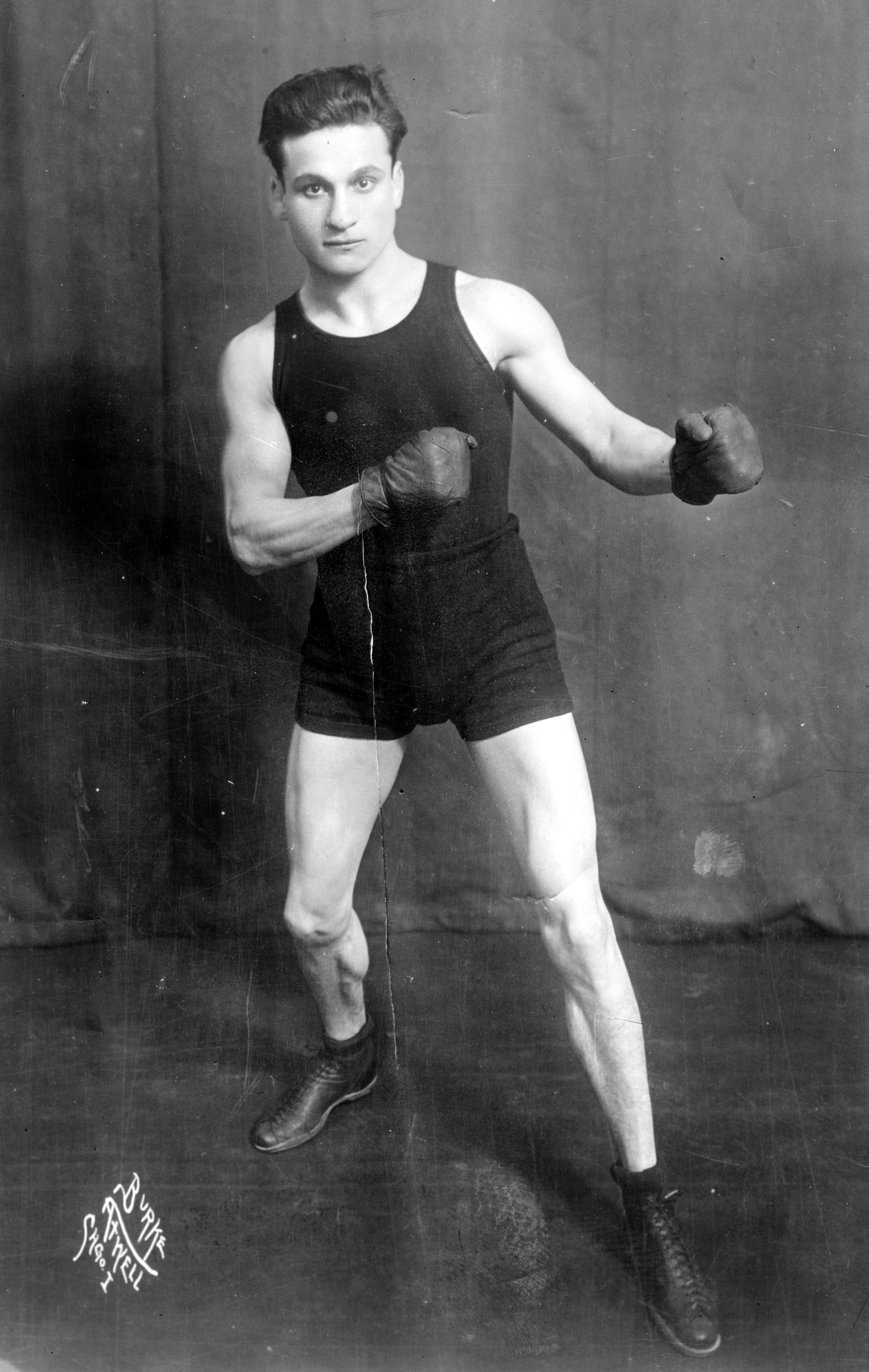
- White in his early boxing days

Personal information
- Nationality: English
- Born: Charles Anchowitz; 25 March 1891 Liverpool, England
- Died: 24 July 1959 (aged 68) Los Angeles, California; California State Hospital
- Height: 5 ft 6 in (1.68 m)
- Weight: Lightweight

Boxing career
- Reach: 68 in (173 cm)
- Stance: Orthodox

Boxing record
- Total fights: 172
- Wins: 123
- Win by KO: 57
- Losses: 35
- Draws: 13
- No contests: 2

Charley White (born Charles Anchowitz, 25 March 1891 – 24 July 1959) was an English-American boxer from Chicago, Illinois. Viewed by many as one of the best of his era, he fought from 1906 until 1923. He also lost a comeback match in 1930 against Henry Perlick, where he threw his famous left hook but Perlick countered with a right cross, knocking him down.

== Biography ==
In his nineteen year career, White fought the top contenders and champions across three weight classes. He had ten championship opponents in the welterweight division: Abe Attell, Johnny Kilbane, and Johnny Dundee in the featherweight division; Ad Wolgast, Willie Ritchie, Freddie Welsh, Benny Leonard and Rocky Kansas in the lightweight division; and Jack Britton, and Ted Kid Lewis.

=== Early life and career ===
Charles Anchowitz was born in Liverpool, England to Jewish parents who brought him to America at the age of seven. His father, a working class tailor from the Russian Pale of Settlement, settled the family in the Jewish Ghetto on Chicago's West Side, home to many great Jewish boxers including Barney Ross and Harry Harris. At thirteen, Charles contracted tuberculosis, and sustained damage to one of his lungs. To combat this, his father sent him to the O'Connell's Sports Club in Chicago to build up his strength. After gaining weight and working out, Charles took up boxing at the club and within eighteen months was diagnosed free from tuberculosis. At fifteen, Charley Anchowitz changed his last name to White and began his professional boxing career. His brothers Jack White and Billy Wagner were also professional boxers. In his career, White fought world champions a total of twenty-two times.

=== Challenges for the feather, and light titles ===
Although White never won a world championship, he fought for the title several times. His first fight against a World Champion came when he was eighteen against the legendary Jewish world featherweight champion Abe Attell on 6 December 1909 in Memphis. Attell won the 8 round "newspaper decision" but had to extend himself to the limit to win over White. White landed rights and lefts to the champion's head and body, but Attell surpassed White in his use of short jabs in the infighting. The decision was unpopular with the crowd. White lost to Attell again on 16 September 1910 at the Hippodrome in Milwaukee, but got in several potent blows against a far more experienced fighter. Attell danced around the ring to gain an angle of advantage, but White showed a solid defense. As they fought at catchweights, Attell's featherweight crown was not at risk.

White lost to future champion Johnny Kilbane in a twelve round bout before 2,200 at Grey's Armory in Cleveland on 23 December 1911. The match was a contest between two of the leading contenders for the world featherweight crown. Both boxers showed great speed and technique. Kilbane would take the world featherweight title on 22 February 1912, and hold it for eleven years.

On 4 July 1913, White valiantly lost to future Welterweight Champion Jack Britton in an eighteen round technical knockout in New Orleans, Louisiana. White may have performed better in the closing rounds if not having broken a bone in his hand in the eighth round. The injury was acquired when White dealt a strong blow to Britton's face. Regardless of his injury, he put up an impressive defense, staying on his feet another ten rounds, before the referee called the bout. Britton gained an advantage from a longer reach, and from White's loss of his left hand, which dealt his left hook, one of his most powerful and effective blows.

On 19 December 1913, White defeated Ad Wolgast former world lightweight champion in a ten round newspaper decision at Dreamland Park in Milwaukee. White dominated the bout with his left hook, but Wolgast was not quite the boxer who earlier held the championship and his punches lacked steam. He had taken the world lightweight championship against Mexican Joe Rivers in July 1912, but lost it in November 1912 to Willie Ritchie. Had points determined the outcome of the fight, and if Wolgast had still held the title, White would have taken the world lightweight championship.

==== World lightweight title attempt, Willie Ritchie, May, 1914 ====
On the 26th of May, 1914, White fought reigning champion Willie Ritchie for the World Lightweight Championship in Milwaukee, Wisconsin in a ten round no decision bout. Though the vast majority of newspapers, including the Milwaukee Free Press believed White had won the match, according to the law of the Wisconsin Boxing Commission, White could only take home the championship by knocking out Ritchie. In one of his most complete victories, The Los Angeles Times wrote that White "defeated the champion (Willie Ritchie) so decisively that even the most prejudiced person in the world could not fail to see that he was master." Ritchie himself admitted that "White did not beat him by a wide margin", implying that his opponent had won the fight. The Boston Globe gave White five rounds, with only two for Ritchie, noting that White had nearly knocked out Richie in the first round. In the final rounds, particularly the tenth, Ritchie was taking most of the punishment, as White increased his winning margin. White's greatest error was his inability to follow up and end the fight after he staggered Ritchie in the first round, but when fighting a world champion a follow-up knockout can be a challenging task. In the second and third, Ritchie was able to ward off the blows of White, and some reporters credited him with only these two rounds. White was said to look far fresher at the end than Ritchie who had both eyes nearly closed, and suffered from serious damage to his face and nose.

White lost a ten round decision to exceptional New York Jewish boxing phenomenon Leach Cross on 25 March 1915, at the shrine of East coast boxing, Madison Square Garden. Cross's trademark crouch, and ability to bore in regardless of the cost, had White baffled at times during the bout, which included constant action throughout. Both boxers felt the effect of their battle by the end of the match. Cross never earned a world title, but fought the best in his career, including most of the feather and lightweight champions White fought himself.

On 21 July 1915, White lost to fellow British and Jewish lightweight Ted "Kid" Lewis, in a newspaper decision at St. Nicholas Rink in New York. Other newspapers considered the fight a draw, but admitted Lewis won at least half the rounds. Once again White's best weapon was his left hook which saved him in the tenth when it landed on Lewis's jaw. Lewis, with his dancing attack common to many English boxers of the time, landed more blows, but White's left hooks, though few in number, landed with more force and affected Lewis more. White made a better showing in the two final rounds.

==== World light title attempt, Freddie Welsh, May, 1916 ====
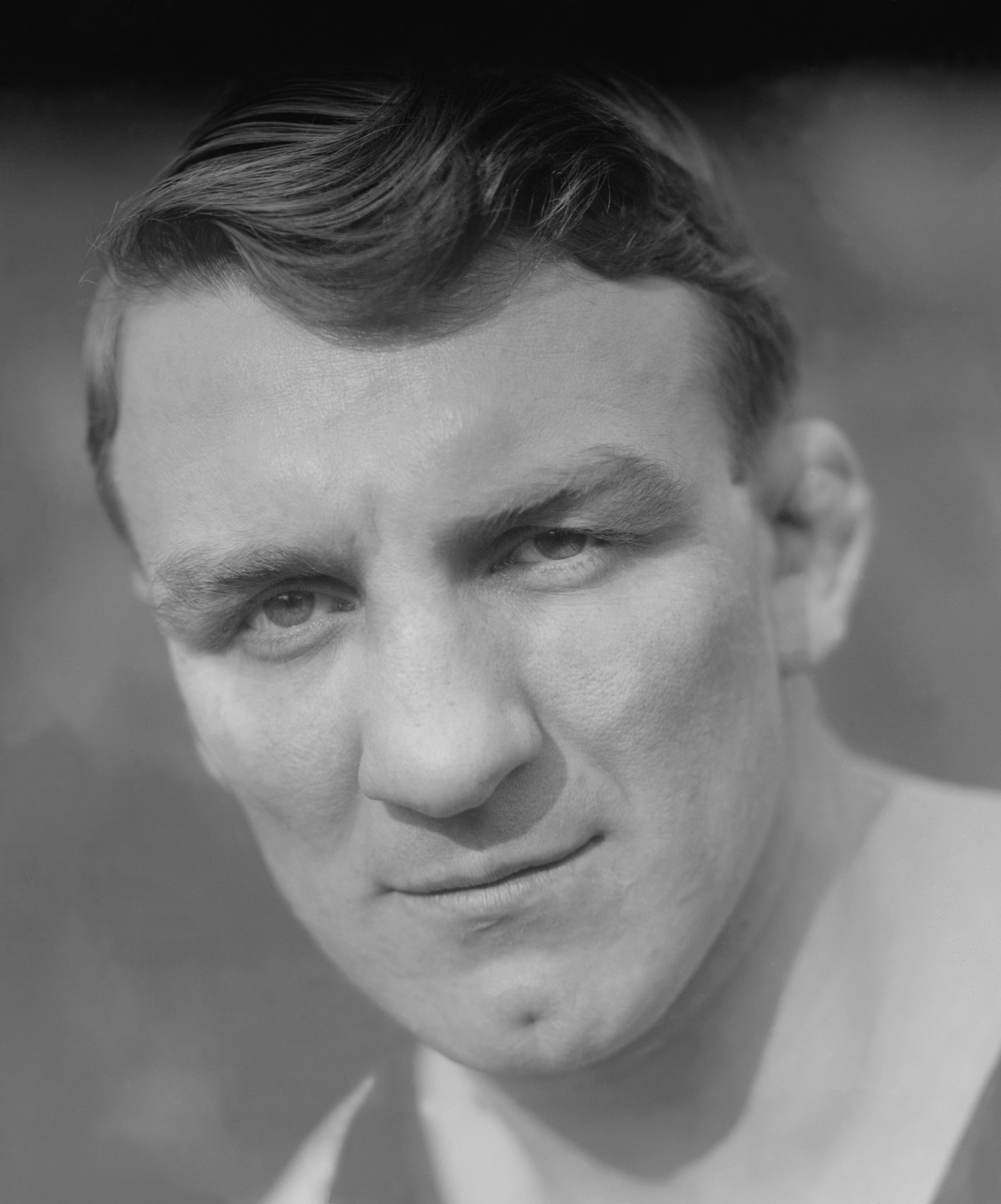
Freddie Welsh, 1920s

White also unsuccessfully challenged reigning lightweight champion Freddie Welsh for his title. White possessed a lethal left hook, but seemed to lack the killer instinct. This fault cost him in his 4 September 1916 attempt to wrest the crown from Welsh at Colorado Springs.

White appeared to have Welsh ready for a knockout in the eleventh, twelfth and thirteenth rounds of their 1916 match, but failed to follow up his advantage. Welsh backpedaled against the aggressive attack of White, who scored with hooks to the head and body, when the two were not clinching. The extremely unpopular 20-round decision was awarded to Welsh, though White appeared to land more blows, causing a small riot to break out in the crowd. Both boxers clinched for a large part of the bout, which also incensed the crowd. As White threw more punches and did more damage in the fight, he would have been awarded the world lightweight championship by today's rules, winning on points. In 1916, however, a challenger to the lightweight crown had to knockout the title holder, and White did not, losing his chance to be remembered as one of boxing's best.

=== Light title bout with Benny Leonard ===
On 5 July 1920, White lost to Jewish boxer and exceptional lightweight champion, Benny Leonard, in a ninth round knockout before an audience of 12,000 at Benton Harbor, Michigan. The fight was a careful battle of boxing strategy, and White wielded the potential for stronger punching with his left hook. Leonard may have won largely due to his faster reaction time, and reflexes against an opponent who was nearly his equal at times. He showed better speed and agility, and used footwork to gain advantages in the angle of his attack. The hard punching White knocked Leonard out of the ring in the fifth round with his left hook, but failed to follow up. Ken Blady wrote that Leonard was helped up by his brother Charley, and did not arise til the count of nine. Once again White had his opponent down, but as famed sportswriter of the day Hype Igoe wrote "White is like the artist who can't resist the temptation of stepping back and admiring his incompleted work." Leonard recovered and by the ninth, White was down five times, finally landing on the canvas for the count from a right cross from Leonard. Leonard had been looking for an opening since the eighth round, and found it after he opened White up with his left jab that led him to deal the final right cross in the ninth. For the first time in nearly 150 bouts, an opponent had knocked out White. Though he had continued to train, Leonard, the incomparable champion, may have performed better had he not had nearly five months off from prizefighting, living in Hollywood. It was one of White's better showings, as he dominated the infighting, and appeared to have thrown more punches, but he fought against an opponent who simply could not be beaten. White paid for his hesitation when Leonard KOed him in the 9th round.

=== Life after boxing and honors ===
After retiring from boxing, White ran a successful gym that catered to wealthy women in Chicago's Loop District. He subsequently relocated to Los Angeles, and trained movie actors. In his 60s he was believed to have suffered from dementia or alzheimer's, likely from his boxing. In March 1956, a jury found White "mentally ill" when his wife asked for his commitment based upon his threats and hallucinations.

White died on 24 July 1959 near Los Angeles at the California State Hospital, where he had been placed three years earlier. His ring record consists of 89 wins (59 KOs), 17 losses, 5 draws, 59 No Decisions (news reports on the No Decisions yield an additional 30 wins, 21 losses, and 8 draws), and 2 No Contests. White was named to the Ring Magazine's list of 100 greatest punchers of all time, probably for his noted skill with the left hook.

== Professional boxing record ==
All information in this section is derived from BoxRec, unless otherwise stated.

=== Official record ===
173 fights	87 wins	16 losses
By knockout	57	4
By decision	29	11
By disqualification	1	1
Draws	5	
No contests	2	
Newspaper decisions/draws	63	

All newspaper decisions are officially regarded as "no decision" bouts and are not counted to the win/loss/draw column.

No.	Result	Record	Opponent	Type	Round, time	Date	Age	Location	Notes
173	Loss	87–16–5 (65)	Henry Perlick	TKO	2 (6), 1:25	Feb 21, 1930	38 years, 333 days	Coliseum, Chicago, Illinois, U.S.	
172	Win	87–15–5 (65)	Bobby Barrett	TKO	6 (10)	Dec 18, 1923	32 years, 268 days	Adelphia A.C., Philadelphia, Pennsylvania, U.S.	
171	Loss	86–15–5 (65)	Pal Moran	TKO	14 (15), 2:49	Oct 5, 1923	32 years, 194 days	Madison Square Garden, New York City, New York, U.S.	
170	Win	86–14–5 (65)	Richie Mitchell	KO	4 (15)	Jul 18, 1923	32 years, 115 days	Velodrome, New York City, New York, U.S.	
169	Loss	85–14–5 (65)	Jack Zivic	NWS	10	Jun 11, 1923	32 years, 78 days	Motor Square Garden, Pittsburgh, Pennsylvania, U.S.	
168	Win	85–14–5 (64)	Johnny Williams	PTS	10	Apr 9, 1923	32 years, 15 days	Ashland Blvd. Auditorium, Chicago, Illinois, U.S.	
167	Loss	84–14–5 (64)	Rocky Kansas	PTS	15	Feb 9, 1923	31 years, 321 days	Madison Square Garden, New York City, New York, U.S.	
166	Win	84–13–5 (64)	Richie Mitchell	TKO	10 (15), 2:49	Dec 15, 1922	31 years, 265 days	Madison Square Garden, New York City, New York, U.S.	
165	Win	83–13–5 (64)	Bobby Barrett	NWS	8	Nov 6, 1922	31 years, 226 days	Olympia A.C., Philadelphia, Pennsylvania, U.S.	
164	Win	83–13–5 (63)	Sid Marks	KO	2 (12), 0:59	Oct 20, 1922	31 years, 209 days	Madison Square Garden, New York City, New York, U.S.	
163	Win	82–13–5 (63)	Bobby Barrett	KO	3 (15)	Aug 7, 1922	31 years, 135 days	Velodrome, New York City, New York, U.S.	
162	Loss	81–13–5 (63)	Ever Hammer	NWS	10	Jun 30, 1922	31 years, 97 days	Mullen-Sager Arena, Aurora, Illinois, U.S.	
161	Win	81–13–5 (62)	Johnny Dundee	NWS	10	Jun 27, 1922	31 years, 94 days	Rock Island, Illinois, U.S.	
160	Win	81–13–5 (61)	Johnny Ray	NWS	10	May 27, 1922	31 years, 63 days	Forbes Field, Pittsburgh, Pennsylvania, U.S.	
159	Loss	81–13–5 (60)	Johnny Dundee	PTS	15	Mar 17, 1922	30 years, 357 days	Madison Square Garden, New York City, New York, U.S.	
158	Win	81–12–5 (60)	Willie Jackson	PTS	15	Feb 20, 1922	30 years, 332 days	Madison Square Garden, New York City, New York, U.S.	
157	Win	80–12–5 (60)	Johnny Dundee	SD	10	Jan 16, 1922	30 years, 297 days	Mechanics Building, Boston, Massachusetts, U.S.	
156	Win	79–12–5 (60)	Freddie Hill	KO	3 (?)	Nov 24, 1921	30 years, 244 days	American Legion Club, Phoenix, Arizona, U.S.	
155	Win	78–12–5 (60)	Billy Alger	KO	3 (?)	Oct 10, 1921	30 years, 199 days	Fort Bliss Arena, El Paso, Texas, U.S.	
154	Win	77–12–5 (60)	Bobby Ward	KO	5 (10)	Sep 30, 1921	30 years, 189 days	Stockyards Stadium, Denver, Colorado, U.S.	
153	Win	76–12–5 (60)	Jimmy Hanlon	PTS	10	Sep 19, 1921	30 years, 178 days	Stockyards Stadium, Denver, Colorado, U.S.	
152	Loss	75–12–5 (60)	Benny Valger	NWS	8	Aug 31, 1921	30 years, 159 days	Shibe Park, Philadelphia, Pennsylvania, U.S.	
151	Draw	75–12–5 (59)	Johnny Dundee	PTS	10	Aug 10, 1921	30 years, 138 days	Boxing Drome, New York City, New York, U.S.	
150	Win	75–12–4 (59)	Terry Long	KO	4 (10)	Jul 22, 1921	30 years, 119 days	Wichita, Kansas, U.S.	
149	Win	74–12–4 (59)	Frankie Schoell	PTS	10	Feb 7, 1921	29 years, 319 days	Broadway Auditorium, Buffalo, New York, U.S.	
148	Loss	73–12–4 (59)	Sailor Friedman	DQ	10 (10)	Jan 14, 1921	29 years, 295 days	Kenosha, Wisconsin, U.S.	White was disqualified for "stalling"
147	Win	73–11–4 (59)	Charles Webb	PTS	10	Jan 1, 1921	29 years, 282 days	Lakeside Park Pavilion, Dayton, Ohio, U.S.	
146	Loss	72–11–4 (59)	Eddie Shannon	NWS	8	Dec 20, 1920	29 years, 270 days	Saint Louis, Missouri, U.S.	
145	Win	72–11–4 (58)	Harvey Thorpe	NWS	10	Sep 3, 1920	29 years, 162 days	Fort Worth, Indiana, U.S.	
144	Loss	72–11–4 (57)	Pal Moran	NWS	10	Aug 28, 1920	29 years, 156 days	East Chicago, Indiana, U.S.	
143	Loss	72–11–4 (56)	Pal Moran	PTS	15	Jul 26, 1920	29 years, 123 days	Heinemann Park, New Orleans, Louisiana, U.S.	
142	Loss	72–10–4 (56)	Benny Leonard	KO	9 (10)	Jul 5, 1920	29 years, 102 days	Floyd Fitzsimmons Arena, Benton Harbor, Michigan, U.S.	
141	Win	72–9–4 (56)	Harlem Eddie Kelly	KO	5 (12)	May 31, 1920	29 years, 67 days	Idora Park, Youngstown, Ohio, U.S.	
140	Win	71–9–4 (56)	Eddie Boehme	KO	4 (10)	Apr 14, 1920	29 years, 20 days	Grand Rapids, Michigan, U.S.	
139	Win	70–9–4 (56)	Don Curley	KO	8 (10)	Feb 26, 1920	28 years, 338 days	Anderson Auditorium, Youngstown, Ohio, U.S.	
138	Win	69–9–4 (56)	Cal Delaney	NWS	10	Feb 25, 1920	28 years, 337 days	Gray's Armory, Cleveland, Ohio, U.S.	
137	Win	69–9–4 (55)	Carl Mackey	TKO	2 (12)	Feb 12, 1920	28 years, 324 days	Denver, Colorado, U.S.	
136	Win	68–9–4 (55)	Muff Bronson	KO	1 (10), 1:40	Jan 1, 1920	28 years, 282 days	Arena, Milwaukie, Oregon, U.S.	
135	Draw	67–9–4 (55)	Eddie Shannon	PTS	6	Dec 9, 1919	28 years, 259 days	Arena, Seattle, Washington, U.S.	
134	Loss	67–9–3 (55)	Johnny Dundee	NWS	10	Nov 26, 1919	28 years, 246 days	Auditorium, Milwaukee, Wisconsin, U.S.	
133	Win	67–9–3 (54)	Mike Paulson	NWS	10	Nov 10, 1919	28 years, 230 days	Armory, Minneapolis, Minnesota, U.S.	
132	Win	67–9–3 (53)	Don Curley	KO	7 (10)	Oct 1, 1919	28 years, 190 days	Arena Gardens, Detroit, Michigan, U.S.	
131	Win	66–9–3 (53)	Tony Zill	NWS	12	Sep 26, 1919	28 years, 185 days	Idora Park, Youngstown, Ohio, U.S.	
130	Win	66–9–3 (52)	Johnny Noye	PTS	12	Sep 2, 1919	28 years, 161 days	Stockyards Stadium, Denver, Colorado, U.S.	
129	Win	65–9–3 (52)	Stanley Yoakum	PTS	12	Aug 22, 1919	28 years, 150 days	Denver, Colorado, U.S.	
128	Win	64–9–3 (52)	Harry Pierce	NWS	6	Aug 11, 1919	28 years, 139 days	Shibe Park, Philadelphia, Pennsylvania, U.S.	
127	Loss	64–9–3 (51)	Eddie Fitzsimmons	PTS	12	Apr 22, 1919	28 years, 28 days	Armory, Boston, Massachusetts, U.S.	
126	Win	64–8–3 (51)	Harvey Thorpe	NWS	10	Mar 10, 1919	27 years, 350 days	Peoria, Illinois, U.S.	
125	Win	64–8–3 (50)	Eddie McGlave	KO	2 (?)	Dec 13, 1918	27 years, 263 days	Fort Sheridan, Wyoming, U.S.	
124	Loss	63–8–3 (50)	Harvey Thorpe	NWS	12	Jul 4, 1918	27 years, 101 days	Western League Baseball Park, Des Moines, Iowa, U.S.	
123	Win	63–8–3 (49)	Joe Upteraft	KO	1 (?)	Mar 1, 1918	N/A	United States of America	Exact date and location unknown at this time
122	NC	62–8–3 (49)	Matt Wells	NC	9 (10)	Oct 5, 1917	26 years, 194 days	Arena, Syracuse, New York, U.S.	
121	Loss	62–8–3 (48)	Johnny Tillman	NWS	10	Sep 20, 1917	26 years, 179 days	St. Nicholas Arena, New York City, New York, U.S.	
120	Win	62–8–3 (47)	Eddie Wagond	NWS	6	Sep 8, 1917	26 years, 167 days	National A.C., Philadelphia, Pennsylvania, U.S.	
119	Loss	62–8–3 (46)	Johnny Tillman	NWS	6	Sep 5, 1917	26 years, 164 days	Shibe Park, Philadelphia, Pennsylvania, U.S.	
118	Win	62–8–3 (45)	Johnny Tillman	NWS	10	Jun 9, 1917	26 years, 76 days	Nicollet Park, Minneapolis, Minnesota, U.S.	
117	Win	62–8–3 (44)	Frank Ciravola	KO	4 (10)	Apr 27, 1917	26 years, 33 days	Arena, Syracuse, New York, U.S.	
116	Win	61–8–3 (44)	Walter Mohr	NWS	10	Apr 19, 1917	26 years, 25 days	New York City, New York, U.S.	
115	Draw	61–8–3 (43)	Frankie Callahan	NWS	10	Mar 29, 1917	26 years, 4 days	Clermont Avenue Rink, New York City, New York, U.S.	
114	Win	61–8–3 (42)	Harry Donahue	KO	6 (10)	Jan 1, 1917	25 years, 282 days	Flower City A.C., Rochester, New York, U.S.	
113	Win	60–8–3 (42)	Harry Pierce	NWS	10	Dec 25, 1916	25 years, 275 days	Clermont Avenue Rink, New York City, New York, U.S.	
112	Win	60–8–3 (41)	Stanley Yoakum	NWS	10	Dec 1, 1916	25 years, 251 days	Harlem S.C., New York City, New York, U.S.	
111	Loss	60–8–3 (40)	Jack Britton	PTS	12	Nov 21, 1916	25 years, 241 days	Arena, Boston, Massachusetts, U.S.	For world welterweight title
110	Win	60–7–3 (40)	Johnny Nelson	NWS	6	Nov 6, 1916	25 years, 226 days	Olympia A.C., Philadelphia, Pennsylvania, U.S.	
109	Win	60–7–3 (39)	Dick DeSanders	NWS	6	Oct 23, 1916	25 years, 212 days	Moose Temple, Pittsburgh, Pennsylvania, U.S.	
108	Loss	60–7–3 (38)	Freddie Welsh	PTS	20	Sep 4, 1916	25 years, 163 days	Ramona A.C. Arena, Colorado Springs, Colorado, U.S.	For world lightweight title
107	Win	60–6–3 (38)	Matt Wells	TKO	5 (12)	Jul 11, 1916	25 years, 108 days	Boston, Massachusetts, U.S.	
106	Draw	59–6–3 (38)	Johnny Griffiths	NWS	12	Jul 4, 1916	25 years, 101 days	League Park, Canton, Ohio, U.S.	
105	Draw	59–6–3 (37)	Richie Mitchell	NWS	10	Jun 2, 1916	25 years, 69 days	Auditorium, Milwaukee, Wisconsin, U.S.	
104	Win	59–6–3 (36)	Milburn Saylor	KO	1 (10)	May 25, 1916	25 years, 61 days	Redland Field, Cincinnati, Ohio, U.S.	
103	Win	58–6–3 (36)	Matt Wells	PTS	15	Apr 6, 1916	25 years, 12 days	Kansas City, Missouri, U.S.	
102	Win	57–6–3 (36)	Matt Wells	NWS	10	Mar 20, 1916	24 years, 361 days	Broadway A.C., Cincinnati, Ohio, U.S.	
101	Win	57–6–3 (35)	Harvey Thorpe	PTS	10	Feb 10, 1916	24 years, 322 days	Convention Hall, Kansas City, Missouri, U.S.	
100	Win	56–6–3 (35)	Vic Moran	PTS	8	Feb 3, 1916	24 years, 315 days	Auditorium, Chattanooga, Tennessee, U.S.	
99	Win	55–6–3 (35)	Joe Azevedo	KO	1 (12)	Jan 18, 1916	24 years, 299 days	Hippodrome, Boston, Massachusetts, U.S.	
98	Loss	54–6–3 (35)	Matt Wells	PTS	12	Jan 4, 1916	24 years, 285 days	Hippodrome, Boston, Massachusetts, U.S.	
97	Win	54–5–3 (35)	Milburn Saylor	KO	1 (12), 1:30	Nov 16, 1915	24 years, 236 days	Atlas A.A., Boston, Massachusetts, U.S.	
96	Loss	53–5–3 (35)	Matt Wells	NWS	10	Oct 29, 1915	24 years, 218 days	Auditorium, Milwaukee, Wisconsin, U.S.	
95	Win	53–5–3 (34)	Johnny Harvey	PTS	12	Oct 19, 1915	24 years, 208 days	Arena (Atlas A.A.), Boston, Massachusetts, U.S.	
94	Win	52–5–3 (34)	Matty Baldwin	KO	1 (12)	Oct 5, 1915	24 years, 194 days	Arena (Atlas A.A.), Boston, Massachusetts, U.S.	
93	Win	51–5–3 (34)	Gilbert Gallant	KO	5 (12)	Sep 21, 1915	24 years, 180 days	Atlas A.A., Boston, Massachusetts, U.S.	
92	Loss	50–5–3 (34)	Ted 'Kid' Lewis	NWS	10	Jul 21, 1915	24 years, 118 days	St. Nicholas Arena, New York City, New York, U.S.	
91	Draw	50–5–3 (33)	Milburn Saylor	PTS	12	Jul 13, 1915	24 years, 110 days	Atlas A.A., Boston, Massachsuetts, U.S.	
90	Win	50–5–2 (33)	Freddie Welsh	NWS	10	Jul 3, 1915	24 years, 100 days	Brighton Beach A.C., New York City, New York, U.S.	
89	Win	50–5–2 (32)	Young Abe Brown	KO	1 (10)	Jun 15, 1915	24 years, 82 days	Harlem River Casino, New York City, New York, U.S.	
88	Win	49–5–2 (32)	Charley Thomas	KO	7 (?)	Jun 8, 1915	24 years, 75 days	Arena (Atlas A.A.), Boston, Massachusetts, U.S.	
87	Win	48–5–2 (32)	Fred Yelle	KO	3 (12)	May 25, 1915	24 years, 61 days	Atlas A.A., Boston, Massachusetts, U.S.	
86	Win	47–5–2 (32)	Hal Stewart	KO	6 (?)	May 12, 1915	24 years, 48 days	Majestic Theatre, Fort Wayne, Indiana, U.S.	
85	Win	46–5–2 (32)	Eddie Murphy	KO	7 (12)	May 4, 1915	24 years, 40 days	Atlas A.A., Boston, Massachusetts, U.S.	
84	Loss	45–5–2 (32)	Lockport Jimmy Duffy	NWS	10	Apr 8, 1915	24 years, 14 days	Broadway Auditorium, Buffalo, New York, U.S.	
83	Win	45–5–2 (31)	Charley Thomas	NWS	6	Mar 29, 1915	24 years, 4 days	Olympia A.C., Philadelphia, Pennsylvania, U.S.	
82	Loss	45–5–2 (30)	Leach Cross	NWS	10	Mar 25, 1915	24 years, 0 days	Madison Square Garden, New York City, New York, U.S.	
81	Win	45–5–2 (29)	Sam Robideau	KO	1 (6)	Mar 17, 1915	23 years, 357 days	National A.C., Philadelphia, Pennsylvania, U.S.	
80	Loss	44–5–2 (29)	Freddie Welsh	NWS	10	Feb 25, 1915	23 years, 337 days	Auditorium, Milwaukee, Wisconsin, U.S.	World lightweight title at stake; (via KO only)
79	Loss	44–5–2 (28)	Joe Shugrue	NWS	10	Dec 29, 1914	23 years, 279 days	Madison Square Garden, New York City, New York, U.S.	
78	Win	44–5–2 (27)	Jimmy Murphy	KO	2 (?)	Dec 14, 1914	23 years, 264 days	Kenosha, Wisconsin, U.S.	
77	Win	43–5–2 (27)	Frankie Callahan	NWS	8	Dec 4, 1914	23 years, 254 days	Saint Louis, Missouri, U.S.	
76	Loss	43–5–2 (26)	Freddie Welsh	NWS	10	Nov 9, 1914	23 years, 229 days	Auditorium, Milwaukee, Wisconsin, U.S.	
75	Draw	43–5–2 (25)	Stanley Yoakum	NWS	10	Oct 5, 1914	23 years, 194 days	Kenosha, Wisconsin, U.S.	
74	Win	43–5–2 (24)	Danny O'Brien	KO	1 (10)	Sep 7, 1914	23 years, 166 days	Stockyards Stadium, Denver, Colorado, U.S.	
73	Win	42–5–2 (24)	Joe Azevedo	TKO	18 (20)	Aug 7, 1914	23 years, 135 days	Coffroth's Arena, Daly City, California, U.S.	
72	Win	41–5–2 (24)	Stanley Yoakum	KO	19 (20)	Jul 14, 1914	23 years, 111 days	Stockyards Stadium, Denver, Colorado, U.S.	
71	Win	40–5–2 (24)	Willie Ritchie	NWS	10	May 26, 1914	23 years, 62 days	Auditorium, Milwaukee, Wisconsin, U.S.	World lightweight title (USA version) at stake; (via KO only)
70	Win	40–5–2 (23)	Joe Azevedo	NWS	10	Mar 23, 1914	22 years, 363 days	Lakeside Auditorium, Racine, Wisconsin, U.S.	
69	Win	40–5–2 (22)	Joe 'Kid' Kansas	KO	3 (10)	Feb 17, 1914	22 years, 329 days	Broadway Auditorium, Buffalo, New York, U.S.	
68	Draw	39–5–2 (22)	Lockport Jimmy Duffy	NWS	10	Jan 23, 1914	22 years, 304 days	Broadway Auditorium, Buffalo, New York, U.S.	
67	Win	39–5–2 (21)	Harry Donahue	KO	2 (?)	Jan 1, 1914	22 years, 282 days	Peoria, Illinois, U.S.	
66	Win	38–5–2 (21)	Ad Wolgast	NWS	10	Dec 19, 1913	22 years, 269 days	Dreamland Park, Milwaukee, Wisconsin, U.S.	
65	Loss	38–5–2 (20)	Johnny Dundee	NWS	10	Nov 27, 1913	22 years, 247 days	Pelican Stadium, New Orleans, Louisiana, U.S.	
64	Win	38–5–2 (19)	Joe 'Kid' Kansas	KO	5 (12)	Nov 17, 1913	22 years, 237 days	Canton Auditorium, Canton, Ohio, U.S.	
63	Win	37–5–2 (19)	Mickey Sheridan	TKO	2 (10)	Sep 15, 1913	22 years, 174 days	Racine, Wisconsin, U.S.	
62	Draw	36–5–2 (19)	Frank Ray Whitney	NWS	12	Sep 1, 1913	22 years, 160 days	League Park, Canton, Ohio, U.S.	
61	Win	36–5–2 (18)	Frank Ray Whitney	PTS	10	Aug 13, 1913	22 years, 141 days	Armory Auditorium, Atlanta, Georgia, U.S.	
60	Win	35–5–2 (18)	Jake Abel	KO	2 (?)	Jul 18, 1913	22 years, 115 days	Armory Auditorium, Atlanta, Georgia, U.S.	
59	Loss	34–5–2 (18)	Jack Britton	TKO	18 (20)	Jul 4, 1913	22 years, 101 days	McDonoghville Park, New Orleans, Louisiana, U.S.	
58	Win	34–4–2 (18)	George Meyers	KO	2 (?)	May 28, 1913	22 years, 64 days	Aurora, Illinois, U.S.	
57	Win	33–4–2 (18)	Joe Thomas	TKO	2 (10)	May 19, 1913	22 years, 55 days	Orleans A.C., New Orleans, Louisiana, U.S.	
56	Win	32–4–2 (18)	Joe Thomas	KO	8 (10)	Apr 21, 1913	22 years, 27 days	Orleans A.C., New Orleans, Louisiana, U.S.	
55	Win	31–4–2 (18)	Philadelphia Pal Moore	NWS	10	Mar 10, 1913	21 years, 350 days	Kenosha, Wisconsin, U.S.	
54	Draw	31–4–2 (17)	Tommy Bresnahan	NWS	10	Jan 10, 1913	21 years, 291 days	South Omaha, Nebraska, U.S.	
53	Win	31–4–2 (16)	Philadelphia Pal Moore	NWS	10	Nov 21, 1912	21 years, 241 days	Kenosha, Wisconsin, U.S.	
52	Win	31–4–2 (15)	Oscar Williams	TKO	5 (12)	Oct 1, 1912	21 years, 190 days	Cleveland, Ohio, U.S.	
51	Win	30–4–2 (15)	Harry Tracey	NWS	10	Oct 1, 1912	21 years, 190 days	Syracuse, New York, U.S.	
50	Win	30–4–2 (14)	Joe Shugrue	NWS	10	Jun 18, 1912	21 years, 85 days	St. Nicholas Arena, New York City, New York, U.S.	
49	Win	30–4–2 (13)	Joe Shugrue	NWS	10	Jun 4, 1912	21 years, 71 days	St. Nicholas Arena, New York City, New York, U.S.	
48	Win	30–4–2 (12)	Owen Moran	DQ	9 (10)	May 20, 1912	21 years, 56 days	Alhambra, Syracuse, New York, U.S.	
47	Win	29–4–2 (12)	Johnny Dundee	NWS	10	Apr 30, 1912	21 years, 36 days	Alhambra, Syracuse, New York, U.S.	
46	Win	29–4–2 (11)	Kid Julian	PTS	12	Apr 8, 1912	21 years, 14 days	Cleveland, Ohio, U.S.	Second fight in one day
45	ND	28–4–2 (11)	Steve Ketchel	ND	10	Apr 8, 1912	21 years, 14 days	East Chicago, Indiana, U.S.	
44	Win	28–4–2 (10)	Steve Ketchel	NWS	10	Apr 1, 1912	21 years, 7 days	East Chicago, Indiana, U.S.	
43	Win	28–4–2 (9)	Tommy Dixon	NWS	8	Feb 28, 1912	20 years, 340 days	Windsor A.C., Windsor, Ontario, Canada	
42	Draw	28–4–2 (8)	Johnny Schultz	NWS	8	Jan 17, 1912	20 years, 298 days	Windsor A.C., Windsor, Ontario, Canada	
41	Win	28–4–2 (7)	Johnny Schultz	PTS	10	Dec 28, 1911	20 years, 278 days	Cleveland, Ohio, U.S.	
40	Loss	27–4–2 (7)	Johnny Kilbane	NWS	12	Dec 23, 1911	20 years, 273 days	Gray's Armory, Cleveland, Ohio, U.S.	
39	Win	27–4–2 (6)	Boyo Driscoll	PTS	8	Oct 23, 1911	20 years, 212 days	Southern A.C., Memphis, Tennessee, U.S.	
38	Win	26–4–2 (6)	Bobby Waugh	PTS	15	May 22, 1911	20 years, 58 days	Fort Worth, Texas, U.S.	
37	Win	25–4–2 (6)	Bobby Waugh	PTS	7	May 11, 1911	20 years, 47 days	Fort Worth, Texas, U.S.	
36	Win	24–4–2 (6)	Pete Savoy	PTS	10	May 2, 1911	20 years, 38 days	Fort Worth, Texas, U.S.	
35	Loss	23–4–2 (6)	Joe Mandot	PTS	8	Apr 17, 1911	20 years, 23 days	Southern A.C., Memphis, Tennessee, U.S.	
34	Draw	23–3–2 (6)	Benny Kaufman	PTS	12	Feb 26, 1911	19 years, 338 days	Columbus, Ohio, U.S.	
33	Loss	23–3–1 (6)	Danny Webster	PTS	20	Nov 24, 1910	19 years, 244 days	Arena, Vernon, California, U.S.	
32	Loss	23–2–1 (6)	Abe Attell	NWS	10	Sep 16, 1910	19 years, 175 days	Hippodrome, Milwaukee, Wisconsin, U.S.	
31	Win	23–2–1 (5)	Frankie Conley	NWS	10	Sep 2, 1910	19 years, 161 days	Hippodrome, Milwaukee, Wisconsin, U.S.	
30	Win	23–2–1 (4)	Eddie Greenwald	NWS	10	May 20, 1910	19 years, 56 days	New Star A.C., Milwaukee, Wisconsin, U.S.	
29	Draw	23–2–1 (3)	Joe Mandot	PTS	8	May 16, 1910	19 years, 52 days	Phoenix A.C., Memphis, Tennessee, U.S.	
28	Loss	23–2 (3)	Willie Gibbs	PTS	8	Mar 28, 1910	19 years, 3 days	Phoenix A.C., Memphis, Tennessee, U.S.	
27	Win	23–1 (3)	Tommy Dixon	PTS	8	Mar 21, 1910	18 years, 361 days	Phoenix A.C., Memphis, Tennessee, U.S.	
26	Win	22–1 (3)	Tommy Dixon	PTS	8	Feb 28, 1910	18 years, 340 days	Phoenix A.C., Memphis, Tennessee, U.S.	
25	Loss	21–1 (3)	Abe Attell	PTS	8	Dec 6, 1909	18 years, 256 days	Phoenix A.C., Memphis, Tennessee, U.S.	
24	Win	21–0 (3)	Sammy Willis	NWS	6	Nov 18, 1909	18 years, 238 days	Broadway A.C., Philadelphia, Pennsylvania, U.S.	
23	Win	21–0 (2)	Pete Savoy	PTS	10	Sep 1, 1909	18 years, 160 days	Memphis, Tennessee, U.S.	
22	Win	20–0 (2)	Pete Savoy	PTS	8	Jul 19, 1909	18 years, 116 days	Memphis, Tennessee, U.S.	
21	Win	19–0 (2)	Young Dougherty	PTS	8	Jul 12, 1909	18 years, 109 days	Memphis, Tennessee, U.S.	
20	Win	18–0 (2)	Jack Barrett	KO	4 (?)	Jun 10, 1909	18 years, 77 days	Gary, Indiana, U.S.	
19	Win	17–0 (2)	Charles Kaspar	KO	3 (?)	May 20, 1909	18 years, 56 days	Aurora, Illinois, U.S.	
18	Win	16–0 (2)	Frankie Conley	NWS	8	May 5, 1909	18 years, 41 days	Windsor A.C., Windsor, Ontario, Canada	
17	Win	16–0 (1)	Paul Sikora	PTS	8	Mar 31, 1909	18 years, 6 days	Windsor A.C., Windsor, Ontario, Canada	
16	Win	15–0 (1)	Earl Denning	NWS	10	Feb 3, 1909	17 years, 315 days	Auditorium, Indianapolis, Indiana, U.S.	
15	Win	15–0	Buck Plotell	KO	3 (?)	Jan 19, 1909	17 years, 300 days	Saint Joseph, Missouri, U.S.	
14	Win	14–0	Barney Troubles	PTS	8	Nov 29, 1908	17 years, 249 days	Waukegan, Illinois, U.S.	
13	Win	13–0	Jimmy Blackburn	PTS	10	Oct 2, 1908	17 years, 191 days	Chicago, Illinois, U.S.	
12	Win	12–0	Lou Boarman	KO	? (?)	Sep 23, 1908	17 years, 182 days	Waukegan, Illinois, U.S.	
11	Win	11–0	Johnny Graham	KO	3 (?)	Aug 15, 1908	17 years, 143 days	Chicago, Illinois, U.S.	
10	Win	10–0	Jack Lester	KO	4 (?)	Mar 28, 1908	17 years, 3 days	Chicago, Illinois, U.S.	
9	Win	9–0	Kid Duffy	KO	6 (?)	Mar 25, 1908	17 years, 0 days	Chicago, Illinois, U.S.	
8	Win	8–0	Billy O'Keefe	KO	2 (?)	Mar 7, 1908	16 years, 348 days	Chicago, Illinois, U.S.	
7	Win	7–0	Young Sherlock	PTS	6	Feb 5, 1908	16 years, 317 days	Chicago, Illinois, U.S.	
6	Win	6–0	Billy Smith	KO	5 (?)	Jan 10, 1908	16 years, 291 days	Chicago, Illinois, U.S.	
5	Win	5–0	Frank Decker	KO	2 (?)	Jan 3, 1908	16 years, 284 days	Chicago, Illinois, U.S.	
4	Win	4–0	Benny Bargordas	PTS	6	Nov 28, 1907	N/A	Muskegon, Michigan, U.S.	Exact date and location unknown at this time
3	Win	3–0	Jefferson Kid	KO	2 (?)	Aug 15, 1907	N/A	New York City, New York, U.S.	Exact date and location unknown at this time
2	Win	2–0	Kid Stinger	KO	1 (?)	May 1, 1907	N/A	New York City, New York, U.S.	Exact date and location unknown at this time
1	Win	1–0	Johnny Graham	KO	3 (?)	Feb 2, 1907	N/A	Chicago, Illinois, U.S.	Exact date and location unknown at this time; Professional Debut

=== Unofficial record ===
173 fights	123 wins	35 losses
By knockout	57	4
By decision	65	30
By disqualification	1	1
Draws	13	
No contests	2	

Record with the inclusion of newspaper decisions to the win/loss/draw column.

No.	Result	Record	Opponent	Type	Round(s)	Date	Age	Location	Notes
173	Loss	123–35–13 (2)	Henry Perlick	TKO	2 (6), 1:25	Feb 21, 1930	38 years, 333 days	Coliseum, Chicago, Illinois, U.S.	
172	Win	123–34–13 (2)	Bobby Barrett	TKO	6 (10)	Dec 18, 1923	32 years, 268 days	Adelphia A.C., Philadelphia, Pennsylvania, U.S.	
171	Loss	122–34–13 (2)	Pal Moran	TKO	14 (15), 2:49	Oct 5, 1923	32 years, 194 days	Madison Square Garden, New York City, New York, U.S.	
170	Win	122–33–13 (2)	Richie Mitchell	KO	4 (15)	Jul 18, 1923	32 years, 115 days	Velodrome, New York City, New York, U.S.	
169	Loss	121–33–13 (2)	Jack Zivic	NWS	10	Jun 11, 1923	32 years, 78 days	Motor Square Garden, Pittsburgh, Pennsylvania, U.S.	
168	Win	121–32–13 (2)	Johnny Williams	PTS	10	Apr 9, 1923	32 years, 15 days	Ashland Blvd. Auditorium, Chicago, Illinois, U.S.	
167	Loss	120–32–13 (2)	Rocky Kansas	PTS	15	Feb 9, 1923	31 years, 321 days	Madison Square Garden, New York City, New York, U.S.	
166	Win	120–31–13 (2)	Richie Mitchell	TKO	10 (15), 2:49	Dec 15, 1922	31 years, 265 days	Madison Square Garden, New York City, New York, U.S.	
165	Win	119–31–13 (2)	Bobby Barrett	NWS	8	Nov 6, 1922	31 years, 226 days	Olympia A.C., Philadelphia, Pennsylvania, U.S.	
164	Win	118–31–13 (2)	Sid Marks	KO	2 (12), 0:59	Oct 20, 1922	31 years, 209 days	Madison Square Garden, New York City, New York, U.S.	
163	Win	117–31–13 (2)	Bobby Barrett	KO	3 (15)	Aug 7, 1922	31 years, 135 days	Velodrome, New York City, New York, U.S.	
162	Loss	116–31–13 (2)	Ever Hammer	NWS	10	Jun 30, 1922	31 years, 97 days	Mullen-Sager Arena, Aurora, Illinois, U.S.	
161	Win	116–30–13 (2)	Johnny Dundee	NWS	10	Jun 27, 1922	31 years, 94 days	Rock Island, Illinois, U.S.	
160	Win	115–30–13 (2)	Johnny Ray	NWS	10	May 27, 1922	31 years, 63 days	Forbes Field, Pittsburgh, Pennsylvania, U.S.	
159	Loss	114–30–13 (2)	Johnny Dundee	PTS	15	Mar 17, 1922	30 years, 357 days	Madison Square Garden, New York City, New York, U.S.	
158	Win	114–29–13 (2)	Willie Jackson	PTS	15	Feb 20, 1922	30 years, 332 days	Madison Square Garden, New York City, New York, U.S.	
157	Win	113–29–13 (2)	Johnny Dundee	SD	10	Jan 16, 1922	30 years, 297 days	Mechanics Building, Boston, Massachusetts, U.S.	
156	Win	112–29–13 (2)	Freddie Hill	KO	3 (?)	Nov 24, 1921	30 years, 244 days	American Legion Club, Phoenix, Arizona, U.S.	
155	Win	111–29–13 (2)	Billy Alger	KO	3 (?)	Oct 10, 1921	30 years, 199 days	Fort Bliss Arena, El Paso, Texas, U.S.	
154	Win	110–29–13 (2)	Bobby Ward	KO	5 (10)	Sep 30, 1921	30 years, 189 days	Stockyards Stadium, Denver, Colorado, U.S.	
153	Win	109–29–13 (2)	Jimmy Hanlon	PTS	10	Sep 19, 1921	30 years, 178 days	Stockyards Stadium, Denver, Colorado, U.S.	
152	Loss	108–29–13 (2)	Benny Valger	NWS	8	Aug 31, 1921	30 years, 159 days	Shibe Park, Philadelphia, Pennsylvania, U.S.	
151	Draw	108–28–13 (2)	Johnny Dundee	PTS	10	Aug 10, 1921	30 years, 138 days	Boxing Drome, New York City, New York, U.S.	
150	Win	108–28–12 (2)	Terry Long	KO	4 (10)	Jul 22, 1921	30 years, 119 days	Wichita, Kansas, U.S.	
149	Win	107–28–12 (2)	Frankie Schoell	PTS	10	Feb 7, 1921	29 years, 319 days	Broadway Auditorium, Buffalo, New York, U.S.	
148	Loss	106–28–12 (2)	Sailor Friedman	DQ	10 (10)	Jan 14, 1921	29 years, 295 days	Kenosha, Wisconsin, U.S.	White was disqualified for "stalling"
147	Win	106–27–12 (2)	Charles Webb	PTS	10	Jan 1, 1921	29 years, 282 days	Lakeside Park Pavilion, Dayton, Ohio, U.S.	
146	Loss	105–27–12 (2)	Eddie Shannon	NWS	8	Dec 20, 1920	29 years, 270 days	Saint Louis, Missouri, U.S.	
145	Win	105–26–12 (2)	Harvey Thorpe	NWS	10	Sep 3, 1920	29 years, 162 days	Fort Worth, Indiana, U.S.	
144	Loss	104–26–12 (2)	Pal Moran	NWS	10	Aug 28, 1920	29 years, 156 days	East Chicago, Indiana, U.S.	
143	Loss	104–25–12 (2)	Pal Moran	PTS	15	Jul 26, 1920	29 years, 123 days	Heinemann Park, New Orleans, Louisiana, U.S.	
142	Loss	104–24–12 (2)	Benny Leonard	KO	9 (10)	Jul 5, 1920	29 years, 102 days	Floyd Fitzsimmons Arena, Benton Harbor, Michigan, U.S.	
141	Win	104–23–12 (2)	Harlem Eddie Kelly	KO	5 (12)	May 31, 1920	29 years, 67 days	Idora Park, Youngstown, Ohio, U.S.	
140	Win	103–23–12 (2)	Eddie Boehme	KO	4 (10)	Apr 14, 1920	29 years, 20 days	Grand Rapids, Michigan, U.S.	
139	Win	102–23–12 (2)	Don Curley	KO	8 (10)	Feb 26, 1920	28 years, 338 days	Anderson Auditorium, Youngstown, Ohio, U.S.	
138	Win	101–23–12 (2)	Cal Delaney	NWS	10	Feb 25, 1920	28 years, 337 days	Gray's Armory, Cleveland, Ohio, U.S.	
137	Win	100–23–12 (2)	Carl Mackey	TKO	2 (12)	Feb 12, 1920	28 years, 324 days	Denver, Colorado, U.S.	
136	Win	99–23–12 (2)	Muff Bronson	KO	1 (10), 1:40	Jan 1, 1920	28 years, 282 days	Arena, Milwaukie, Oregon, U.S.	
135	Draw	98–23–12 (2)	Eddie Shannon	PTS	6	Dec 9, 1919	28 years, 259 days	Arena, Seattle, Washington, U.S.	
134	Loss	98–23–11 (2)	Johnny Dundee	NWS	10	Nov 26, 1919	28 years, 246 days	Auditorium, Milwaukee, Wisconsin, U.S.	
133	Win	98–22–11 (2)	Mike Paulson	NWS	10	Nov 10, 1919	28 years, 230 days	Armory, Minneapolis, Minnesota, U.S.	
132	Win	97–22–11 (2)	Don Curley	KO	7 (10)	Oct 1, 1919	28 years, 190 days	Arena Gardens, Detroit, Michigan, U.S.	
131	Win	96–22–11 (2)	Tony Zill	NWS	12	Sep 26, 1919	28 years, 185 days	Idora Park, Youngstown, Ohio, U.S.	
130	Win	95–22–11 (2)	Johnny Noye	PTS	12	Sep 2, 1919	28 years, 161 days	Stockyards Stadium, Denver, Colorado, U.S.	
129	Win	94–22–11 (2)	Stanley Yoakum	PTS	12	Aug 22, 1919	28 years, 150 days	Denver, Colorado, U.S.	
128	Win	93–22–11 (2)	Harry Pierce	NWS	6	Aug 11, 1919	28 years, 139 days	Shibe Park, Philadelphia, Pennsylvania, U.S.	
127	Loss	92–22–11 (2)	Eddie Fitzsimmons	PTS	12	Apr 22, 1919	28 years, 28 days	Armory, Boston, Massachusetts, U.S.	
126	Win	92–21–11 (2)	Harvey Thorpe	NWS	10	Mar 10, 1919	27 years, 350 days	Peoria, Illinois, U.S.	
125	Win	91–21–11 (2)	Eddie McGlave	KO	2 (?)	Dec 13, 1918	27 years, 263 days	Fort Sheridan, Wyoming, U.S.	
124	Loss	90–21–11 (2)	Harvey Thorpe	NWS	12	Jul 4, 1918	27 years, 101 days	Western League Baseball Park, Des Moines, Iowa, U.S.	
123	Win	90–20–11 (2)	Joe Upteraft	KO	1 (?)	Mar 1, 1918	N/A	United States of America	Exact date and location unknown at this time
122	NC	89–20–11 (2)	Matt Wells	NC	9 (10)	Oct 5, 1917	26 years, 194 days	Arena, Syracuse, New York, U.S.	
121	Loss	89–20–11 (1)	Johnny Tillman	NWS	10	Sep 20, 1917	26 years, 179 days	St. Nicholas Arena, New York City, New York, U.S.	
120	Win	89–19–11 (1)	Eddie Wagond	NWS	6	Sep 8, 1917	26 years, 167 days	National A.C., Philadelphia, Pennsylvania, U.S.	
119	Loss	88–19–11 (1)	Johnny Tillman	NWS	6	Sep 5, 1917	26 years, 164 days	Shibe Park, Philadelphia, Pennsylvania, U.S.	
118	Win	88–18–11 (1)	Johnny Tillman	NWS	10	Jun 9, 1917	26 years, 76 days	Nicollet Park, Minneapolis, Minnesota, U.S.	
117	Win	87–18–11 (1)	Frank Ciravola	KO	4 (10)	Apr 27, 1917	26 years, 33 days	Arena, Syracuse, New York, U.S.	
116	Win	86–18–11 (1)	Walter Mohr	NWS	10	Apr 19, 1917	26 years, 25 days	New York City, New York, U.S.	
115	Draw	85–18–11 (1)	Frankie Callahan	NWS	10	Mar 29, 1917	26 years, 4 days	Clermont Avenue Rink, New York City, New York, U.S.	
114	Win	85–18–10 (1)	Harry Donahue	KO	6 (10)	Jan 1, 1917	25 years, 282 days	Flower City A.C., Rochester, New York, U.S.	
113	Win	84–18–10 (1)	Harry Pierce	NWS	10	Dec 25, 1916	25 years, 275 days	Clermont Avenue Rink, New York City, New York, U.S.	
112	Win	83–18–10 (1)	Stanley Yoakum	NWS	10	Dec 1, 1916	25 years, 251 days	Harlem S.C., New York City, New York, U.S.	
111	Loss	82–18–10 (1)	Jack Britton	PTS	12	Nov 21, 1916	25 years, 241 days	Arena, Boston, Massachusetts, U.S.	For world welterweight title
110	Win	82–17–10 (1)	Johnny Nelson	NWS	6	Nov 6, 1916	25 years, 226 days	Olympia A.C., Philadelphia, Pennsylvania, U.S.	
109	Win	81–17–10 (1)	Dick DeSanders	NWS	6	Oct 23, 1916	25 years, 212 days	Moose Temple, Pittsburgh, Pennsylvania, U.S.	
108	Loss	80–17–10 (1)	Freddie Welsh	PTS	20	Sep 4, 1916	25 years, 163 days	Ramona A.C. Arena, Colorado Springs, Colorado, U.S.	For world lightweight title
107	Win	80–16–10 (1)	Matt Wells	TKO	5 (12)	Jul 11, 1916	25 years, 108 days	Boston, Massachusetts, U.S.	
106	Draw	79–16–10 (1)	Johnny Griffiths	NWS	12	Jul 4, 1916	25 years, 101 days	League Park, Canton, Ohio, U.S.	
105	Draw	79–16–9 (1)	Richie Mitchell	NWS	10	Jun 2, 1916	25 years, 69 days	Auditorium, Milwaukee, Wisconsin, U.S.	
104	Win	79–16–8 (1)	Milburn Saylor	KO	1 (10)	May 25, 1916	25 years, 61 days	Redland Field, Cincinnati, Ohio, U.S.	
103	Win	78–16–8 (1)	Matt Wells	PTS	15	Apr 6, 1916	25 years, 12 days	Kansas City, Missouri, U.S.	
102	Win	77–16–8 (1)	Matt Wells	NWS	10	Mar 20, 1916	24 years, 361 days	Broadway A.C., Cincinnati, Ohio, U.S.	
101	Win	76–16–8 (1)	Harvey Thorpe	PTS	10	Feb 10, 1916	24 years, 322 days	Convention Hall, Kansas City, Missouri, U.S.	
100	Win	75–16–8 (1)	Vic Moran	PTS	8	Feb 3, 1916	24 years, 315 days	Auditorium, Chattanooga, Tennessee, U.S.	
99	Win	74–16–8 (1)	Joe Azevedo	KO	1 (12)	Jan 18, 1916	24 years, 299 days	Hippodrome, Boston, Massachusetts, U.S.	
98	Loss	73–16–8 (1)	Matt Wells	PTS	12	Jan 4, 1916	24 years, 285 days	Hippodrome, Boston, Massachusetts, U.S.	
97	Win	73–15–8 (1)	Milburn Saylor	KO	1 (12), 1:30	Nov 16, 1915	24 years, 236 days	Atlas A.A., Boston, Massachusetts, U.S.	
96	Loss	72–15–8 (1)	Matt Wells	NWS	10	Oct 29, 1915	24 years, 218 days	Auditorium, Milwaukee, Wisconsin, U.S.	
95	Win	72–14–8 (1)	Johnny Harvey	PTS	12	Oct 19, 1915	24 years, 208 days	Arena (Atlas A.A.), Boston, Massachusetts, U.S.	
94	Win	71–14–8 (1)	Matty Baldwin	KO	1 (12)	Oct 5, 1915	24 years, 194 days	Arena (Atlas A.A.), Boston, Massachusetts, U.S.	
93	Win	70–14–8 (1)	Gilbert Gallant	KO	5 (12)	Sep 21, 1915	24 years, 180 days	Atlas A.A., Boston, Massachusetts, U.S.	
92	Loss	69–14–8 (1)	Ted 'Kid' Lewis	NWS	10	Jul 21, 1915	24 years, 118 days	St. Nicholas Arena, New York City, New York, U.S.	
91	Draw	69–13–8 (1)	Milburn Saylor	PTS	12	Jul 13, 1915	24 years, 110 days	Atlas A.A., Boston, Massachsuetts, U.S.	
90	Win	69–13–7 (1)	Freddie Welsh	NWS	10	Jul 3, 1915	24 years, 100 days	Brighton Beach A.C., New York City, New York, U.S.	
89	Win	68–13–7 (1)	Young Abe Brown	KO	1 (10)	Jun 15, 1915	24 years, 82 days	Harlem River Casino, New York City, New York, U.S.	
88	Win	67–13–7 (1)	Charley Thomas	KO	7 (?)	Jun 8, 1915	24 years, 75 days	Arena (Atlas A.A.), Boston, Massachusetts, U.S.	
87	Win	66–13–7 (1)	Fred Yelle	KO	3 (12)	May 25, 1915	24 years, 61 days	Atlas A.A., Boston, Massachusetts, U.S.	
86	Win	65–13–7 (1)	Hal Stewart	KO	6 (?)	May 12, 1915	24 years, 48 days	Majestic Theatre, Fort Wayne, Indiana, U.S.	
85	Win	64–13–7 (1)	Eddie Murphy	KO	7 (12)	May 4, 1915	24 years, 40 days	Atlas A.A., Boston, Massachusetts, U.S.	
84	Loss	63–13–7 (1)	Lockport Jimmy Duffy	NWS	10	Apr 8, 1915	24 years, 14 days	Broadway Auditorium, Buffalo, New York, U.S.	
83	Win	63–12–7 (1)	Charley Thomas	NWS	6	Mar 29, 1915	24 years, 4 days	Olympia A.C., Philadelphia, Pennsylvania, U.S.	
82	Loss	62–12–7 (1)	Leach Cross	NWS	10	Mar 25, 1915	24 years, 0 days	Madison Square Garden, New York City, New York, U.S.	
81	Win	62–11–7 (1)	Sam Robideau	KO	1 (6)	Mar 17, 1915	23 years, 357 days	National A.C., Philadelphia, Pennsylvania, U.S.	
80	Loss	61–11–7 (1)	Freddie Welsh	NWS	10	Feb 25, 1915	23 years, 337 days	Auditorium, Milwaukee, Wisconsin, U.S.	World lightweight title at stake; (via KO only)
79	Loss	61–10–7 (1)	Joe Shugrue	NWS	10	Dec 29, 1914	23 years, 279 days	Madison Square Garden, New York City, New York, U.S.	
78	Win	61–9–7 (1)	Jimmy Murphy	KO	2 (?)	Dec 14, 1914	23 years, 264 days	Kenosha, Wisconsin, U.S.	
77	Win	60–9–7 (1)	Frankie Callahan	NWS	8	Dec 4, 1914	23 years, 254 days	Saint Louis, Missouri, U.S.	
76	Loss	59–9–7 (1)	Freddie Welsh	NWS	10	Nov 9, 1914	23 years, 229 days	Auditorium, Milwaukee, Wisconsin, U.S.	
75	Draw	59–8–7 (1)	Stanley Yoakum	NWS	10	Oct 5, 1914	23 years, 194 days	Kenosha, Wisconsin, U.S.	
74	Win	59–8–6 (1)	Danny O'Brien	KO	1 (10)	Sep 7, 1914	23 years, 166 days	Stockyards Stadium, Denver, Colorado, U.S.	
73	Win	58–8–6 (1)	Joe Azevedo	TKO	18 (20)	Aug 7, 1914	23 years, 135 days	Coffroth's Arena, Daly City, California, U.S.	
72	Win	57–8–6 (1)	Stanley Yoakum	KO	19 (20)	Jul 14, 1914	23 years, 111 days	Stockyards Stadium, Denver, Colorado, U.S.	
71	Win	56–8–6 (1)	Willie Ritchie	NWS	10	May 26, 1914	23 years, 62 days	Auditorium, Milwaukee, Wisconsin, U.S.	World lightweight title (USA version) at stake; (via KO only)
70	Win	55–8–6 (1)	Joe Azevedo	NWS	10	Mar 23, 1914	22 years, 363 days	Lakeside Auditorium, Racine, Wisconsin, U.S.	
69	Win	54–8–6 (1)	Joe 'Kid' Kansas	KO	3 (10)	Feb 17, 1914	22 years, 329 days	Broadway Auditorium, Buffalo, New York, U.S.	
68	Draw	53–8–6 (1)	Lockport Jimmy Duffy	NWS	10	Jan 23, 1914	22 years, 304 days	Broadway Auditorium, Buffalo, New York, U.S.	
67	Win	53–8–5 (1)	Harry Donahue	KO	2 (?)	Jan 1, 1914	22 years, 282 days	Peoria, Illinois, U.S.	
66	Win	52–8–5 (1)	Ad Wolgast	NWS	10	Dec 19, 1913	22 years, 269 days	Dreamland Park, Milwaukee, Wisconsin, U.S.	
65	Loss	51–8–5 (1)	Johnny Dundee	NWS	10	Nov 27, 1913	22 years, 247 days	Pelican Stadium, New Orleans, Louisiana, U.S.	
64	Win	51–7–5 (1)	Joe 'Kid' Kansas	KO	5 (12)	Nov 17, 1913	22 years, 237 days	Canton Auditorium, Canton, Ohio, U.S.	
63	Win	50–7–5 (1)	Mickey Sheridan	TKO	2 (10)	Sep 15, 1913	22 years, 174 days	Racine, Wisconsin, U.S.	
62	Draw	49–7–5 (1)	Frank Ray Whitney	NWS	12	Sep 1, 1913	22 years, 160 days	League Park, Canton, Ohio, U.S.	
61	Win	49–7–4 (1)	Frank Ray Whitney	PTS	10	Aug 13, 1913	22 years, 141 days	Armory Auditorium, Atlanta, Georgia, U.S.	
60	Win	48–7–4 (1)	Jake Abel	KO	2 (?)	Jul 18, 1913	22 years, 115 days	Armory Auditorium, Atlanta, Georgia, U.S.	
59	Loss	47–7–4 (1)	Jack Britton	TKO	18 (20)	Jul 4, 1913	22 years, 101 days	McDonoghville Park, New Orleans, Louisiana, U.S.	
58	Win	47–6–4 (1)	George Meyers	KO	2 (?)	May 28, 1913	22 years, 64 days	Aurora, Illinois, U.S.	
57	Win	46–6–4 (1)	Joe Thomas	TKO	2 (10)	May 19, 1913	22 years, 55 days	Orleans A.C., New Orleans, Louisiana, U.S.	
56	Win	45–6–4 (1)	Joe Thomas	KO	8 (10)	Apr 21, 1913	22 years, 27 days	Orleans A.C., New Orleans, Louisiana, U.S.	
55	Win	44–6–4 (1)	Philadelphia Pal Moore	NWS	10	Mar 10, 1913	21 years, 350 days	Kenosha, Wisconsin, U.S.	
54	Draw	43–6–4 (1)	Tommy Bresnahan	NWS	10	Jan 10, 1913	21 years, 291 days	South Omaha, Nebraska, U.S.	
53	Win	43–6–3 (1)	Philadelphia Pal Moore	NWS	10	Nov 21, 1912	21 years, 241 days	Kenosha, Wisconsin, U.S.	
52	Win	42–6–3 (1)	Oscar Williams	TKO	5 (12)	Oct 1, 1912	21 years, 190 days	Cleveland, Ohio, U.S.	
51	Win	41–6–3 (1)	Harry Tracey	NWS	10	Oct 1, 1912	21 years, 190 days	Syracuse, New York, U.S.	
50	Win	40–6–3 (1)	Joe Shugrue	NWS	10	Jun 18, 1912	21 years, 85 days	St. Nicholas Arena, New York City, New York, U.S.	
49	Win	39–6–3 (1)	Joe Shugrue	NWS	10	Jun 4, 1912	21 years, 71 days	St. Nicholas Arena, New York City, New York, U.S.	
48	Win	38–6–3 (1)	Owen Moran	DQ	9 (10)	May 20, 1912	21 years, 56 days	Alhambra, Syracuse, New York, U.S.	
47	Win	37–6–3 (1)	Johnny Dundee	NWS	10	Apr 30, 1912	21 years, 36 days	Alhambra, Syracuse, New York, U.S.	
46	Win	36–6–3 (1)	Kid Julian	PTS	12	Apr 8, 1912	21 years, 14 days	Cleveland, Ohio, U.S.	Second fight in one day
45	ND	35–6–3 (1)	Steve Ketchel	ND	10	Apr 8, 1912	21 years, 14 days	East Chicago, Indiana, U.S.	
44	Win	35–6–3	Steve Ketchel	NWS	10	Apr 1, 1912	21 years, 7 days	East Chicago, Indiana, U.S.	
43	Win	34–6–3	Tommy Dixon	NWS	8	Feb 28, 1912	20 years, 340 days	Windsor A.C., Windsor, Ontario, Canada	
42	Draw	33–6–3	Johnny Schultz	NWS	8	Jan 17, 1912	20 years, 298 days	Windsor A.C., Windsor, Ontario, Canada	
41	Win	33–6–2	Johnny Schultz	PTS	10	Dec 28, 1911	20 years, 278 days	Cleveland, Ohio, U.S.	
40	Loss	32–6–2	Johnny Kilbane	NWS	12	Dec 23, 1911	20 years, 273 days	Gray's Armory, Cleveland, Ohio, U.S.	
39	Win	32–5–2	Boyo Driscoll	PTS	8	Oct 23, 1911	20 years, 212 days	Southern A.C., Memphis, Tennessee, U.S.	
38	Win	31–5–2	Bobby Waugh	PTS	15	May 22, 1911	20 years, 58 days	Fort Worth, Texas, U.S.	
37	Win	30–5–2	Bobby Waugh	PTS	7	May 11, 1911	20 years, 47 days	Fort Worth, Texas, U.S.	
36	Win	29–5–2	Pete Savoy	PTS	10	May 2, 1911	20 years, 38 days	Fort Worth, Texas, U.S.	
35	Loss	28–5–2	Joe Mandot	PTS	8	Apr 17, 1911	20 years, 23 days	Southern A.C., Memphis, Tennessee, U.S.	
34	Draw	28–4–2	Benny Kaufman	PTS	12	Feb 26, 1911	19 years, 338 days	Columbus, Ohio, U.S.	
33	Loss	28–4–1	Danny Webster	PTS	20	Nov 24, 1910	19 years, 244 days	Arena, Vernon, California, U.S.	
32	Loss	28–3–1	Abe Attell	NWS	10	Sep 16, 1910	19 years, 175 days	Hippodrome, Milwaukee, Wisconsin, U.S.	
31	Win	28–2–1	Frankie Conley	NWS	10	Sep 2, 1910	19 years, 161 days	Hippodrome, Milwaukee, Wisconsin, U.S.	
30	Win	27–2–1	Eddie Greenwald	NWS	10	May 20, 1910	19 years, 56 days	New Star A.C., Milwaukee, Wisconsin, U.S.	
29	Draw	26–2–1	Joe Mandot	PTS	8	May 16, 1910	19 years, 52 days	Phoenix A.C., Memphis, Tennessee, U.S.	
28	Loss	26–2	Willie Gibbs	PTS	8	Mar 28, 1910	19 years, 3 days	Phoenix A.C., Memphis, Tennessee, U.S.	
27	Win	26–1	Tommy Dixon	PTS	8	Mar 21, 1910	18 years, 361 days	Phoenix A.C., Memphis, Tennessee, U.S.	
26	Win	25–1	Tommy Dixon	PTS	8	Feb 28, 1910	18 years, 340 days	Phoenix A.C., Memphis, Tennessee, U.S.	
25	Loss	24–1	Abe Attell	PTS	8	Dec 6, 1909	18 years, 256 days	Phoenix A.C., Memphis, Tennessee, U.S.	
24	Win	24–0	Sammy Willis	NWS	6	Nov 18, 1909	18 years, 238 days	Broadway A.C., Philadelphia, Pennsylvania, U.S.	
23	Win	23–0	Pete Savoy	PTS	10	Sep 1, 1909	18 years, 160 days	Memphis, Tennessee, U.S.	
22	Win	22–0	Pete Savoy	PTS	8	Jul 19, 1909	18 years, 116 days	Memphis, Tennessee, U.S.	
21	Win	21–0	Young Dougherty	PTS	8	Jul 12, 1909	18 years, 109 days	Memphis, Tennessee, U.S.	
20	Win	20–0	Jack Barrett	KO	4 (?)	Jun 10, 1909	18 years, 77 days	Gary, Indiana, U.S.	
19	Win	19–0	Charles Kaspar	KO	3 (?)	May 20, 1909	18 years, 56 days	Aurora, Illinois, U.S.	
18	Win	18–0	Frankie Conley	NWS	8	May 5, 1909	18 years, 41 days	Windsor A.C., Windsor, Ontario, Canada	
17	Win	17–0	Paul Sikora	PTS	8	Mar 31, 1909	18 years, 6 days	Windsor A.C., Windsor, Ontario, Canada	
16	Win	16–0	Earl Denning	NWS	10	Feb 3, 1909	17 years, 315 days	Auditorium, Indianapolis, Indiana, U.S.	
15	Win	15–0	Buck Plotell	KO	3 (?)	Jan 19, 1909	17 years, 300 days	Saint Joseph, Missouri, U.S.	
14	Win	14–0	Barney Troubles	PTS	8	Nov 29, 1908	17 years, 249 days	Waukegan, Illinois, U.S.	
13	Win	13–0	Jimmy Blackburn	PTS	10	Oct 2, 1908	17 years, 191 days	Chicago, Illinois, U.S.	
12	Win	12–0	Lou Boarman	KO	? (?)	Sep 23, 1908	17 years, 182 days	Waukegan, Illinois, U.S.	
11	Win	11–0	Johnny Graham	KO	3 (?)	Aug 15, 1908	17 years, 143 days	Chicago, Illinois, U.S.	
10	Win	10–0	Jack Lester	KO	4 (?)	Mar 28, 1908	17 years, 3 days	Chicago, Illinois, U.S.	
9	Win	9–0	Kid Duffy	KO	6 (?)	Mar 25, 1908	17 years, 0 days	Chicago, Illinois, U.S.	
8	Win	8–0	Billy O'Keefe	KO	2 (?)	Mar 7, 1908	16 years, 348 days	Chicago, Illinois, U.S.	
7	Win	7–0	Young Sherlock	PTS	6	Feb 5, 1908	16 years, 317 days	Chicago, Illinois, U.S.	
6	Win	6–0	Billy Smith	KO	5 (?)	Jan 10, 1908	16 years, 291 days	Chicago, Illinois, U.S.	
5	Win	5–0	Frank Decker	KO	2 (?)	Jan 3, 1908	16 years, 284 days	Chicago, Illinois, U.S.	
4	Win	4–0	Benny Bargordas	PTS	6	Nov 28, 1907	N/A	Muskegon, Michigan, U.S.	Exact date and location unknown at this time
3	Win	3–0	Jefferson Kid	KO	2 (?)	Aug 15, 1907	N/A	New York City, New York, U.S.	Exact date and location unknown at this time
2	Win	2–0	Kid Stinger	KO	1 (?)	May 1, 1907	N/A	New York City, New York, U.S.	Exact date and location unknown at this time
1	Win	1–0	Johnny Graham	KO	3 (?)	Feb 2, 1907	N/A	Chicago, Illinois, U.S.	Exact date and location unknown at this time; Professional Debut
