= Eddie Kelly (boxer) =

American boxer

- Kelly in 1908

Personal information
- Nicknames: Buffalo Eddie Kelly; The Buffalo Newsboy; The Buffalo Whirlwind
- Nationality: American (United States)
- Born: Eddie Kelly; May 7, 1885 Buffalo, New York
- Died: 1944 (aged 58–59)
- Weight: Featherweight

Boxing career
- Stance: Orthodox

Boxing record
- Total fights: 60
- Wins: 25
- Win by KO: 12
- Losses: 20
- Draws: 13
- No contests: 2

"Buffalo" Eddie Kelly (May 7, 1885 – 1944) was an American boxer who contended three times for the Featherweight Championship of the World against reigning champion Abe Attell between February 1908 and February 1909. Attell was Featherweight Champion for a record eleven years, between 1901 and 1912, and fought Kelly three more times in non-title fights. Kelly's three attempts at the Featherweight Championship were a record at the time for the three-year period, and it placed him squarely in the top five of rated Featherweights for those years.

== Early boxing career ==
First plying his trade as a newsboy, Kelly started his boxing career in the greater New York area around 1900, fighting largely in clubs in Buffalo, Niagara Falls, Erie, Pennsylvania and northeastern Canada. Fighting prior to 1905, he fought Jockey Brady, Darby Giles, and Kid Gleason twice each. He fought the better known boxer Paddy Lavin three times beating him twice and drawing once. Lavin was a skilled 5' 11" Irish welterweight from Buffalo who would beat several outstanding boxers in his class after 1909 including Leo Houck, Unk Russell and ex-welterweight champion Honey Mellody. In forty-two of Kelly's better publicized fights between 1900 and 1907, he lost only six bouts, winning an impressive nine by knockout or technical knockout.

== Prepping for the Featherweight Title ==
Battling Nelson

By 1906, he was sparring regularly with Battling Nelson, a lightweight world champion and training partner, who sang his praises. Nelson once told a reporter prior to Kelly's bout with Tommy O'Toole, "He sparred with me two and three times a day when I was doing my training for my bout with Terry McGovern...Kelly is the hardest little hitter I ever bumped up against. He has two good hands and they are ever ready to mix it up with you..."

In the spring of 1906, he knocked out competent club fighters Jack Flanigan, Abe Hollandersky, and Barney Abel in one round at the Metropolitan Athletic Club in Manhattan. The New York Evening World wrote in a promo for his next bout with George Hoey, that "Kelly is after a bout for the Featherweight Championship with Abe Attell and to demonstrate his worth is meeting the best feathers in this city. His path so far has been a rosy one. In Hoey he tackles a tough proposition, and if he scores decisively his claim to a fight with Attell will be merited." On March 30, 1906, he defeated George Hoey in the third round at the famed Sharkey Athletic Club in Manhattan. Only two years later, the Sharkey A. C. would be the setting for what may be considered America's greatest boxing painting, George Bellows', Stag at Sharkey's.

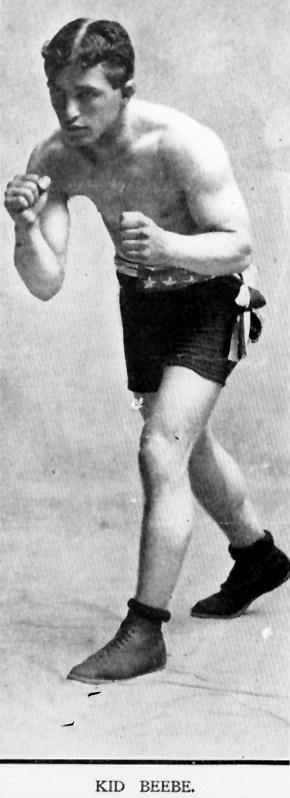
Kid Beebe

The Evening World wrote after his match with Kelly, that "Hoey is a rugged lad who likes to fight in close, his specialty being swapping punches at close range. The World went on to note that "in this style he (Hoey) met his master in Kelly, who would lead with a left jab and then tear in with head down, working both hands like piston rods for his opponent's mid-section." Shortly before his bout with Attell, Kelly had an important win against Kid Beebe on November 22, 1907, which he won on a disqualification. Beebe was a prolific boxer with over 250 career fights. He once beat Jack Britton and fought the great welterweight Leo Houck. Beebe may have had a disadvantage against Kelly due to his short stature. In May and November 1906, Kelly fought Tommy O'Toole, who in September 1909 would also contend for the Featherweight Crown against Attell.

== Three attempts at the Featherweight Championship ==
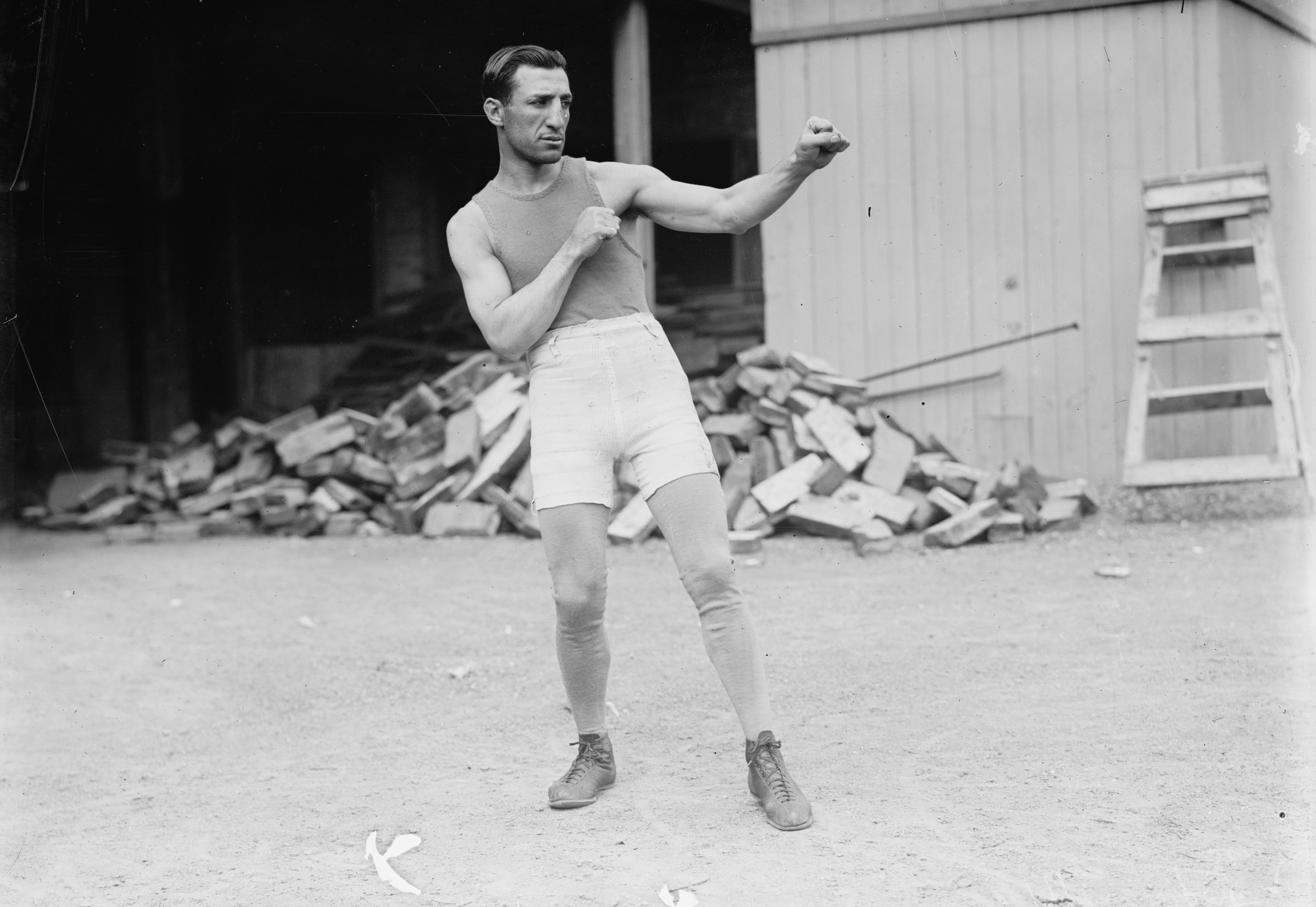
Abe Attell, Featherweight Champ

In a buildup to the Featherweight Championship, many Kelly fans were optimistic about his chances with Attell, due to his past performance. The Los Angeles Herald wrote, "some enthusiastic Kelly men profess to believe that he will enter the ring a favorite over Attell...Kelly is hailed as the successor to Terry McGovern and there is reason for it. He resembles the once terrible one in many ways. He has the same aggressive appearance, is stoutly built on the best of fighting lines and is a tremendous hitter for a boy of his size. He is a featherweight from his chest down, but his arms are almost as heavily muscled as those of a welterweight." But it was not to be.

The San Francisco Call took note of Attell's strategy in Kelly's first shot at the Featherweight Championship on February 28, 1908, at Dreamland Rink in San Francisco. The Call wrote that "from the workmanlike manner in which he (Attell) brought the unequal contest to a close, it was evident that he could have ended it much sooner had he been so inclined." By the seventh round "it was evident that he wanted to knock out his opponent then and there if possible." The referee completed a full count shortly after the fight was called a TKO by a Police Captain present at ringside. Kelly made no excuses for his performance and admitted what many already knew when he told one reporter, "he was outclassed by Attell", and simply lacked the champion's experience.

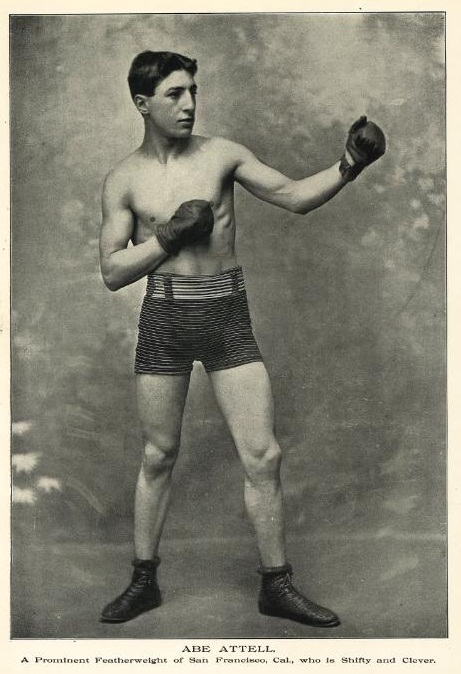
Attell in his youth

In their second Featherweight title bout in Washington state on April 20, 1908, Attell finished Kelly in eight rounds, chewing gum during the match. The Seattle Star concluded the following day that Kelly had shown skill and determination and "demonstrated an ability to take punishment", but in the end, "it was a case of science against dogged determination, and science won."

Attell's ability to end his matches in a predetermined number of rounds was so remarkable that it became the stuff of legend. Boxing writer Ken Blady reported that Attell bet $8,000 he would end his first bout with Kelly within eight rounds, and when he won in seven, he gave his winnings to Kelly so he could afford a home for his mother. By 1912, wary of Attell's antics with gambling, the New York State Athletic Commission barred him from boxing in the state for six months.

Remarkably, in their third and last Featherweight title match on February 4, 1909, in New Orleans, Attell once again finished the bout in seven rounds. Kelly was never the same. In his remaining three fights with Attell, he lost in four, five, and six rounds. After his lessons from Attell, Kelly lost bouts with greater frequency but with more challenging opponents before he retired from the ring around 1913. The El Paso Herald noted that Kelly had once fought a draw with future Welterweight Champion Jack Britton, and beaten the noteworthy New York boxer Grover Hayes.

Kelly died at sea in 1944, whilst with the United States Merchant Marine.
