= Abe Attell =

American boxer (1883–1970)

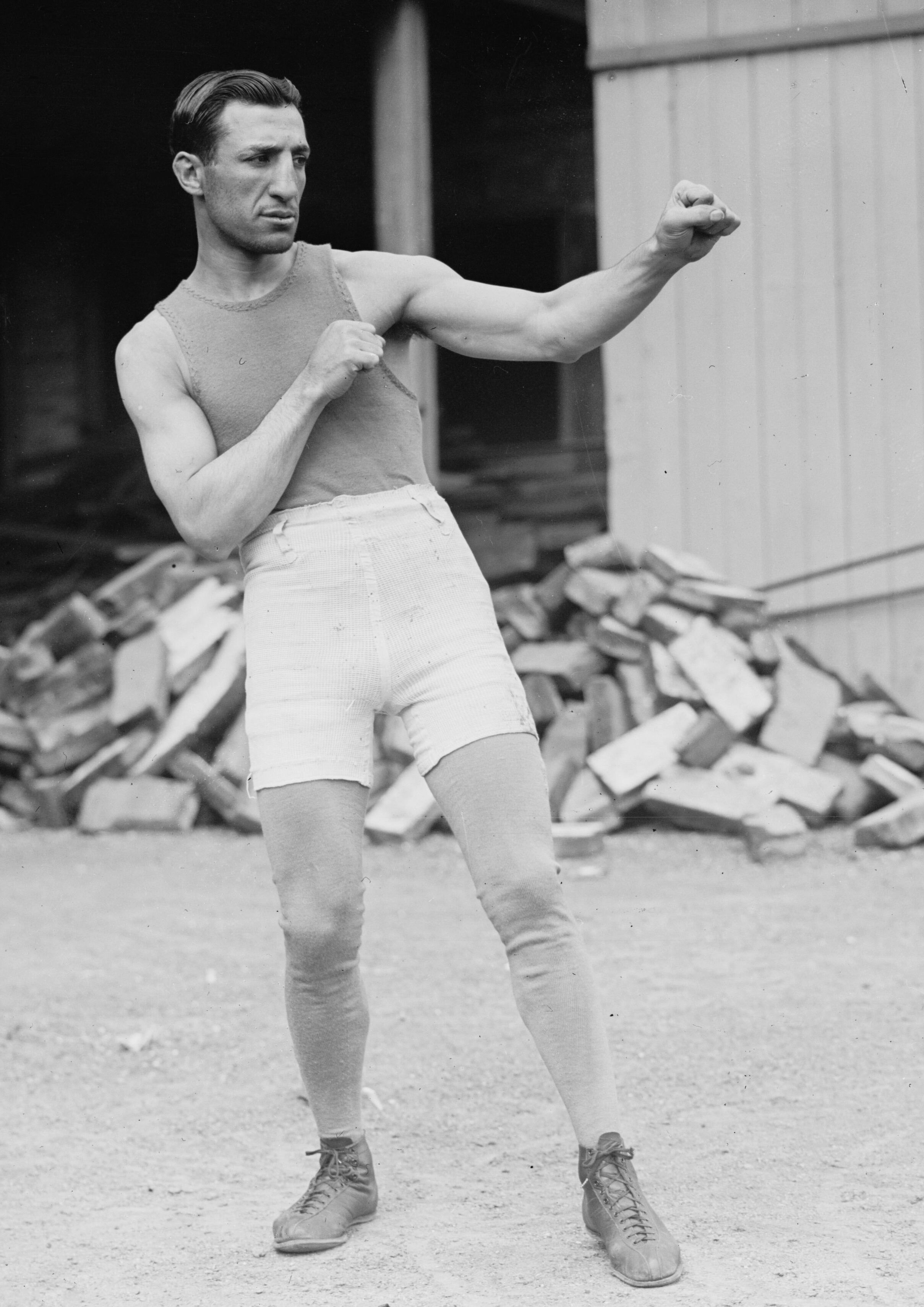

Personal information
- Nickname: The Little Hebrew
- Born: Abraham Washington Attell; February 22, 1883 San Francisco, California, U.S.
- Died: February 7, 1970 (aged 86) New Paltz, New York, U.S.
- Height: 5 ft 4 in (1.63 m)
- Weight: Featherweight

Boxing career
- Reach: 66 in (168 cm)
- Stance: Orthodox

Boxing record
- Total fights: 154
- Wins: 110
- Win by KO: 38
- Losses: 17
- Draws: 25
- No contests: 2

Abraham Washington Attell (February 22, 1883 – February 7, 1970), often referred to by newspapers as "The Little Hebrew", was an American boxer who became known for his record-setting, six year consecutive reign as World Featherweight Champion from 1906 to 1912, and his nearly consecutive ten-year reign starting in 1902. Said to be a friend of the gangster Arnold Rothstein, Attell was charged with game fixing in the Black Sox Scandal in 1919, but the charges were dismissed before trial. He also was suspected of other infractions including fixing fights, and using drugs during a fight.

== Early life and career ==
Attell was born in San Francisco, California, the son of Jewish parents. Many sources give his year of birth as 1884, but in an article published in the October 1961 issue of Cavalier magazine, he stated that he had turned 78 that year. A copy of his passport also gives his birth year as 1883, and the 1900 U.S. Census gives his age as 17. Growing up in a mostly Irish neighborhood, he was often involved in fights with neighborhood boys. He said as a kid, he sometimes had up to 10 bouts each day. After his father abandoned the family when Attell was 13, he sold newspapers to earn money. Selling at the corner of 8th and Market, near the Mechanics Pavilion, a frequent venue for important boxing matches, Attell watched the fight between Solly Smith and George Dixon for the world's Featherweight championship. With that, Attell and his brothers Caesar and Monte became convinced they might have futures in boxing.

Attell's first professional fight was at age 17 on August 19, 1900, when he knocked out Kid Lennett in two rounds at the San Francisco Athletic Club. His mother, who strongly opposed his boxing, later became one of his staunchest supporters, betting on him to win.

== World featherweight champion ==
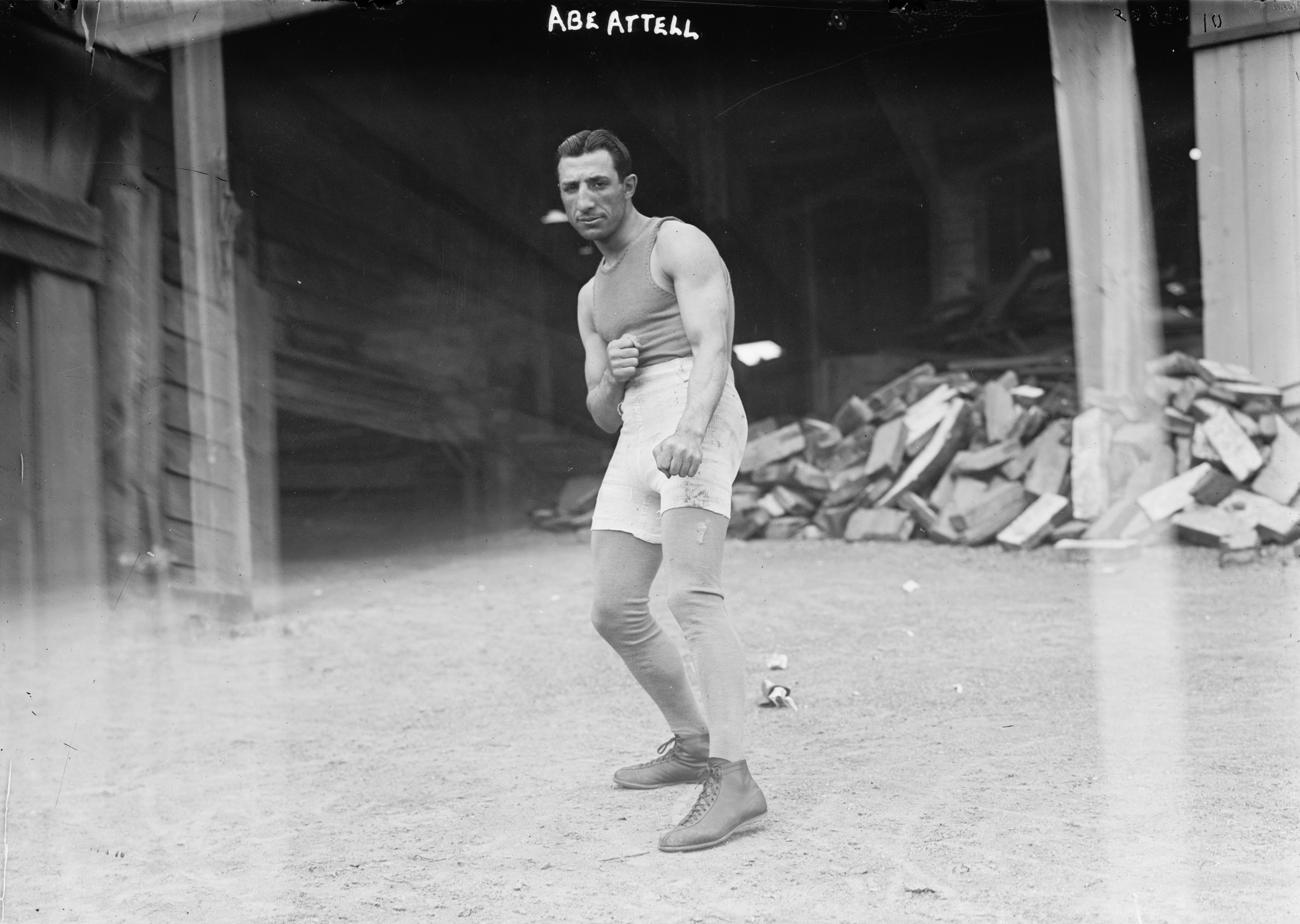
Portrait of Attell

After winning 10 fights in a row by knockout, Attell moved to Denver, Colorado. At the age of 18, he fought George Dixon and beat him in a 15-round decision after having drawn with him twice before. In 1903, he beat Johnny Reagan in a 20 round decision to claim the previously vacated featherweight title one year after Young Corbett II vacated.

Attell successfully defended his title twenty-two times between 1906 and 1912, which to this day remains a division record. Among other opponents, Attell beat Battling Nelson and Johnny Kilbane during this period. He was often called "The Little Champ" or "The Little Hebrew" by newspapers. From 1909 to 1910, his brother Monte Attell, called the "Nob Hill Terror", held the Bantamweight Championship, making them the first brothers to hold world titles simultaneously. His brother, Caesar Attell also fought and was called "Two and a Half," for always giving that amount whenever the hat was passed for charity at a boxing event, which he attended faithfully. During his time as world featherweight champion, Attell was allegedly involved with gambler/gangster Arnold Rothstein. According to some accounts, they became good friends during this period.

Attell defeated American 1905 World Bantamweight Champion Jimmy Walsh three times in title matches; on September 12, 1907, for a ten-round decision in Indianapolis, on December 7, 1906, in a ten-round TKO in Los Angeles, and on February 22, 1906, for a fifteen-round decision in Chelsea, Massachusetts, in which Attell "badly punished" Walsh. Not surprisingly, Attell was the odds on favorite for the December 1906 fight. He met Attell twice in non-title matches on April 3, 1913, in New York in a ten-round loss by decision and on October 24, 1912, in a twelve-round draw in Boston. After the April 3, 1913, New York bout, Walsh's manager Eddie Keevin filed charges against Attell with the New York boxing commission stating that Attell had used eye gouging against Walsh during the fight.

=== Later career ===
Attell lost his World Featherweight Title to Johnny Kilbane in 1912, in a 20-round decision. Kilbane claimed that Attell's handlers put chloroform on the fighter's glove to blind him. Other witnesses claimed other illegal tactics were used in the fight. On July 4, 1913, Attell accidentally hit a referee during a win against Willie Beecher. He finally retired in 1917. Attell managed one boxer, Marty Goldman. He coached him to a 33 Win (10 ko's), 11 Loss, 3 Draw record in 47 career fights.

After his professional boxing career ended, Attell operated a shoe store in New York City, doing a good business selling to customers, fans and sporting people who came in to see him. He gave up the shoe business around June 1916 to go into vaudeville.

His name was later linked to the infamous Black Sox baseball scandal of 1919. He was alleged to have been the bag man for gambler Arnold Rothstein and to have given $10,000 to several Chicago White Sox players. They had in return agreed to throw the World Series with Cincinnati. When the scandal broke in 1920, Attell went to Canada for a year to avoid being subpoenaed. Rothstein was never indicted for the crime.

=== Black Sox Scandal ===
In 1920 Attell was accused of being the messenger between the gangster Rothstein and players of the Chicago White Sox baseball organization, during the planning stages of the fix of the 1919 World Series. Prior to the series, Attell had been approached by former fighter Billy Maharg and former Major League Baseball pitcher "Sleepy" Bill Burns in their bid to get Rothstein to financially back the fix. The Black Sox scandal was considered a major outrage in sports and Attell's name appeared in newspaper headlines related to the scandal. He and many White Sox players were formally charged with several counts, including fixing the event, however Rothstein was never charged. All were eventually acquitted at trial, but Major League Baseball banned them from participating in baseball activities at any level. Attell denied having been involved in any talks about fixing the series and convinced the jury that the wrong Abe Attell was accused.

In the 1988 film Eight Men Out, Attell was portrayed by actor Michael Mantell.

=== Death ===
Attell died in New Paltz, New York, on February 7, 1970.

In 2017, McFarland & Company published the first comprehensive biography of Attell, The Fighting Times of Abe Attell, by author Mark Allen Baker.

== Legacy and honors ==
Attell was inducted posthumously as a member of various halls of fame:

- 1955, the Ring Boxing Hall of Fame
- 1982, National Jewish Sports Hall of Fame;
- 1983, the International Jewish Sports Hall of Fame
- 1981, World Boxing Hall of Fame.
- 1985, San Francisco Boxing Hall of Fame;
- 1990, first class of the International Boxing Hall of Fame
- His record of 92 wins, 10 losses, 18 draws and 45 no-decisions, with 51 wins by knockout, earned him a place on the list of Ring Magazine: "Fighters with 50 or More Knockout Wins".

== Professional boxing record ==
All information in this section is derived from BoxRec, unless otherwise stated.

=== Official record ===
154 fights	72 wins	9 losses
By knockout	38	4
By decision	34	5
Draws	19	
No contests	2	
Newspaper decisions/draws	52	

All newspaper decisions are officially regarded as “no decision” bouts and are not counted in the win/loss/draw column.

No.	Result	Record	Opponent	Type	Round	Date	Location	Notes
154	Loss	72–9–19 (54)	Phil Virgets	TKO	4 (15)	Jan 8, 1917	Orleans A.C., New Orleans, Louisiana, U.S.	
153	Win	72–8–19 (54)	Frankie Callahan	KO	3 (10)	Sep 6, 1915	Gloversville, New York, U.S.	
152	Loss	71–8–19 (54)	Willie Beecher	NWS	10	Jul 24, 1913	Atlantic A.A., Rockaway Beach, Queens, New York City, New York, U.S.	
151	Win	71–8–19 (53)	George Chaney	PTS	15	Apr 28, 1913	Empire Theater, Baltimore, Maryland, U.S.	
150	NC	70–8–19 (53)	Benny Kaufman	NC	7 (10)	Apr 15, 1913	Orpheum Theater, Atlanta, Georgia, U.S.	Promoter Henry Norton stopped the bout and declared it a "no contest."
149	Win	70–8–19 (52)	Jimmy Walsh	NWS	10	Apr 3, 1913	Forty-Fourth Street A.C., Manhattan, New York City, New York, U.S.	
148	Win	70–8–19 (51)	Oliver Kirk	TKO	3 (10)	Mar 19, 1913	Forty-Fourth Street A.C., Manhattan, New York City, New York, U.S.	
147	Loss	69–8–19 (51)	Oliver Kirk	TKO	6 (8)	Nov 27, 1912	Saint Louis, Missouri, U.S.	
146	Draw	69–7–19 (51)	Jimmy Walsh	PTS	10	Sep 24, 1912	Pilgrim A.A., Boston, Massachusetts, U.S.	
145	Loss	69–7–18 (51)	Harry Thomas	NWS	10	Sep 13, 1912	Madison Square Garden, Manhattan, New York City, New York, U.S.	
144	Draw	69–7–18 (50)	Harlem Tommy Murphy	PTS	20	Aug 3, 1912	Coffroth's Mission Street Arena, Daly City, California, U.S.	
143	Win	69–7–17 (50)	Eddie Marino	PTS	10	Jul 3, 1912	Tacoma A.C., Tacoma, Washington, U.S.	
142	Win	68–7–17 (50)	Jimmy Carroll	KO	7 (20)	Mar 23, 1912	Capital AC, Sacramento, California, U.S.	
141	Loss	67–7–17 (50)	Harlem Tommy Murphy	PTS	20	Mar 9, 1912	Coffroth's Arena, Daly City, California, U.S.	
140	Loss	67–6–17 (50)	Johnny Kilbane	PTS	20	Feb 22, 1912	Arena, Vernon, California, U.S.	Lost world featherweight title
139	Loss	67–5–17 (50)	Knockout Brown	NWS	10	Jan 18, 1912	National S.C., Manhattan, New York City, New York, U.S.	
138	Win	67–5–17 (49)	Willie Jones	NWS	10	Dec 2, 1911	Gowanus A.C., Brooklyn, New York City, New York, U.S.	
137	Win	67–5–17 (48)	Patsy Kline	NWS	10	Dec 1, 1911	Navarre A.C., Brooklyn, New York City, New York, U.S.	
136	Win	67–5–17 (47)	Leo Johnson	TKO	5 (10)	Nov 23, 1911	Malvern A.C., Bronx, New York City, New York, U.S.	
135	Win	66–5–17 (47)	Willie Jones	NWS	10	Nov 20, 1911	Olympia Boxing Club, Manhattan, New York City, New York, U.S.	
134	Win	66–5–17 (46)	Young Johnny Cohen	NWS	10	Nov 15, 1911	Houston A.C., Manhattan, New York City, New York, U.S.	
133	Win	66–5–17 (45)	Herman Smith	NWS	10	Nov 3, 1911	International A.C., Buffalo, New York, U.S.	
132	Loss	66–5–17 (44)	Matt Wells	NWS	10	Sep 20, 1911	Madison A.C., Manhattan, New York City, New York, U.S.	
131	Win	66–5–17 (43)	Frankie Burns	NWS	10	Mar 31, 1911	New Amsterdam Opera House, Manhattan, New York City, New York, U.S.	
130	NC	66–5–17 (42)	Tommy Kilbane	NC	4 (10)	Jan 30, 1911	Eagles Club, Cleveland, Ohio, U.S.	Attell broke his right humeral bone when the fighters stumbled and fell
129	Draw	66–5–17 (41)	Billy Allen	NWS	10	Jan 23, 1911	Alhambra, Syracuse, New York, U.S.	
128	Win	66–5–17 (40)	Patsy Kline	NWS	10	Jan 13, 1911	New Amsterdam Opera House, Manhattan, New York City, New York, U.S.	
127	Win	66–5–17 (39)	Joe Coster	NWS	10	Jan 9, 1911	Vanderbilt A.C., Brooklyn, New York City, New York, U.S.	
126	Win	66–5–17 (38)	Philadelphia Pal Moore	NWS	10	Nov 30, 1910	Fairmont A.C., Bronx, New York City, New York, U.S.	
125	Draw	66–5–17 (37)	Frankie Conley	PTS	15	Nov 13, 1910	West Side A.C., Gretna, Louisiana, U.S.	Retained world featherweight title
124	Draw	66–5–16 (37)	Owen Moran	NWS	6	Nov 9, 1910	National A.C., Philadelphia, Pennsylvania, U.S.	
123	Win	66–5–16 (36)	Eddie Kelly	KO	4 (?)	Oct 28, 1910	Mohawk Valley A.C., Amsterdam, New York, U.S.	
122	Win	65–5–16 (36)	Biz Mackey	TKO	6 (10)	Oct 27, 1910	Brown's Gym, Manhattan, New York City, New York, U.S.	
121	Win	64–5–16 (36)	Johnny Kilbane	PTS	10	Oct 24, 1910	Hippodrome, Kansas City, Missouri, U.S.	
120	Draw	63–5–16 (36)	Jack White	PTS	15	Oct 10, 1910	Winnipeg, Manitoba, Canada	
119	Win	63–5–15 (36)	Frankie White	NWS	10	Oct 7, 1910	Hippodrome, Milwaukee, Wisconsin, U.S.	
118	Win	63–5–15 (35)	Charley White	NWS	10	Sep 16, 1910	Hippodrome, Milwaukee, Wisconsin, U.S.	
117	Win	63–5–15 (34)	Billy Lauder	KO	7 (15)	Sep 5, 1910	Mission Hill, Calgary, Alberta, Canada	Won lightweight championship of Calgary
116	Win	62–5–15 (34)	Eddie Marino	KO	3 (15)	Aug 22, 1910	Calgary, Alberta, Canada	
115	Win	61–5–15 (34)	Owen Moran	NWS	10	Jun 24, 1910	Naud Junction Pavilion, Los Angeles, California, U.S.	
114	Win	61–5–15 (33)	Harlem Tommy Murphy	NWS	10	May 20, 1910	New Amsterdam Opera House, National S.C., Manhattan, New York City, New York, U.S.	
113	Loss	61–5–15 (32)	Harlem Tommy Murphy	NWS	10	Apr 28, 1910	Empire A.C., Manhattan Casino, Manhattan, New York City, New York, U.S.	
112	Win	61–5–15 (31)	Owen Moran	NWS	10	Apr 1, 1910	Fairmont A.C., Bronx, New York City, New York, U.S.	
111	Win	61–5–15 (30)	Johnny Marto	NWS	10	Mar 18, 1910	New Amsterdam Opera House, National S.C., Manhattan, New York City, New York, U.S.	
110	Win	61–5–15 (29)	Harry Forbes	TKO	7 (?)	Feb 28, 1910	Troy, New York, U.S.	
109	Win	60–5–15 (29)	Frankie Neil	NWS	10	Feb 24, 1910	Long Acre A.C., Manhattan, New York City, New York, U.S.	
108	Win	60–5–15 (28)	Eddie Kelly	TKO	5 (15)	Jan 1, 1910	Southern A.C., Savannah, Georgia, U.S.	
107	Win	59–5–15 (28)	Charley White	PTS	8	Dec 6, 1909	Phoenix A.C., Memphis, Tennessee, U.S.	
106	Win	58–5–15 (28)	Johnny Moran	PTS	8	Nov 22, 1909	Memphis, Tennessee, U.S.	Retained world featherweight title
105	Win	57–5–15 (28)	Patsy Kline	NWS	6	Oct 8, 1909	Nonpareil A.C., Philadelphia, Pennsylvania, U.S.	
104	Win	57–5–15 (27)	Buck 'Twin' Miller	NWS	6	Oct 5, 1909	Douglas A.C., Philadelphia, Pennsylvania, U.S.	
103	Win	57–5–15 (26)	Tommy O'Toole	PTS	12	Sep 14, 1909	Armory, Boston, Massachusetts, U.S.	Retained world featherweight title
102	Win	56–5–15 (26)	Eddie Kelly	NWS	6	Sep 6, 1909	Luna Park, Pittsburgh, Pennsylvania, U.S.	
101	Draw	56–5–15 (25)	Harry Stone	NWS	10	Aug 18, 1909	Convention Hall, Saratoga, New York, U.S.	
100	Win	56–5–15 (24)	Biz Mackey	TKO	8 (10)	Apr 26, 1909	Southern Theatre, Columbus, Ohio, U.S.	Retained world featherweight title
99	Win	55–5–15 (24)	Frankie White	KO	8 (20)	Mar 26, 1909	Dayton A.C., Dayton, Ohio, U.S.	
98	Win	54–5–15 (24)	Frankie Neil	NWS	10	Mar 23, 1909	Bedford A.C., Brooklyn, New York City, New York, U.S.	
97	Win	54–5–15 (23)	Patsy Kline	NWS	10	Mar 18, 1909	Whirlwind A.C., Brooklyn, New York City, New York, U.S.	
96	Win	54–5–15 (22)	Young Pierce	KO	6 (15)	Mar 10, 1909	Olympic Club, Essington, Pennsylvania, U.S.	
95	Win	53–5–15 (22)	Young Pierce	NWS	6	Mar 1, 1909	Washington S.C., Philadelphia, Pennsylvania, U.S.	
94	Loss	53–5–15 (21)	Jim Driscoll	NWS	10	Feb 19, 1909	National A.C., Manhattan, New York City, New York, U.S.	
93	Win	53–5–15 (20)	Eddie Kelly	TKO	7 (10)	Feb 4, 1909	Southern A.C., New Orleans, Louisiana, U.S.	Retained world featherweight title
92	Win	52–5–15 (20)	Freddie Weeks	KO	10 (20)	Jan 14, 1909	Goldfield A.C., Goldfield, Nevada, U.S.	Retained world featherweight title
91	Win	51–5–15 (20)	Biz Mackey	KO	8 (15)	Dec 29, 1908	West Side A.C., Gretna, Louisiana, U.S.	Retained world featherweight title
90	Draw	50–5–15 (20)	Ad Wolgast	NWS	10	Dec 11, 1908	Naud Junction Pavilion, Los Angeles, California, U.S.	
89	Loss	50–5–15 (19)	Freddie Welsh	PTS	15	Nov 25, 1908	Jeffries' Arena, Vernon, California, U.S.	
88	Draw	50–4–15 (19)	Owen Moran	PTS	23	Sep 7, 1908	Mission Street Arena, San Francisco, California, U.S.	Retained world featherweight title
87	Win	50–4–14 (19)	Eddie Marino	PTS	10	Jul 29, 1908	Sandpoint, California, U.S.	
86	Win	49–4–14 (19)	Matty Baldwin	NWS	6	Jun 26, 1908	Grand Union A.C., Manhattan, New York City, New York, U.S.	
85	Win	49–4–14 (18)	Tommy Sullivan	TKO	4 (20)	Apr 30, 1908	Coliseum, San Francisco, California, U.S.	
84	Win	48–4–14 (18)	Eddie Kelly	KO	8 (20)	Apr 20, 1908	Sound Beach, Washington, U.S.	Retained world featherweight title
83	Draw	47–4–14 (18)	Battling Nelson	PTS	15	Mar 31, 1908	Coliseum, San Francisco, California, U.S.	
82	Win	47–4–13 (18)	Eddie Kelly	TKO	7 (20)	Feb 28, 1908	Dreamland Rink, San Francisco, California, U.S.	Retained world featherweight title
81	Win	46–4–13 (18)	Frankie Neil	TKO	13 (20)	Jan 31, 1908	Dreamland Rink, San Francisco, California, U.S.	Retained world featherweight title
80	Draw	45–4–13 (18)	Owen Moran	PTS	25	Jan 1, 1908	Coffroth's Arena, Colma, California, U.S.	Retained world featherweight title
79	Win	45–4–12 (18)	Freddie Weeks	TKO	4 (20)	Oct 29, 1907	Naud Junction Pavilion, Los Angeles, California, U.S.	Retained world featherweight title
78	Draw	44–4–12 (18)	Tommy Sullivan	PTS	8	Sep 21, 1907	Physical Culture Farm, Alton, Illinois, U.S.	
77	Win	44–4–11 (18)	Jimmy Walsh	PTS	10	Sep 12, 1907	Auditorium (Virginia Ave.), Indianapolis, Indiana, U.S.	Retained world featherweight title
76	Win	43–4–11 (18)	Benny 'Kid' Solomon	PTS	20	May 24, 1907	Naud Junction Pavilion, Los Angeles, California, U.S.	Retained world featherweight title
75	Loss	42–4–11 (18)	Tommy O'Toole	NWS	6	Apr 17, 1907	National A.C., Philadelphia, Pennsylvania, U.S.	
74	Draw	42–4–11 (17)	Spike Robson	NWS	6	Apr 3, 1907	National A.C., Philadelphia, Pennsylvania, U.S.	
73	Win	42–4–11 (16)	Harry Baker	KO	8 (20)	Jan 18, 1907	Naud Junction Pavilion, Los Angeles, California, U.S.	Retained world featherweight title
72	Win	41–4–11 (16)	Jimmy Walsh	TKO	9 (20)	Dec 7, 1906	Naud Junction Pavilion, Los Angeles, California, U.S.	Retained world featherweight title
71	Win	40–4–11 (16)	Billy DeCoursey	PTS	15	Nov 16, 1906	National Athletic Club, San Diego, California, U.S.	Retained world featherweight title
70	Win	39–4–11 (16)	Harry Baker	PTS	20	Oct 30, 1906	Naud Junction Pavilion, Los Angeles, California, U.S.	Retained world featherweight title
69	Win	38–4–11 (16)	Frank Carsey	RTD	3 (15)	Sep 3, 1906	Davenport, Iowa, U.S.	
68	Win	37–4–11 (16)	Frank Carsey	PTS	15	Aug 15, 1906	Reed's Lake, Grand Rapids, Michigan, U.S.	
67	Win	36–4–11 (16)	Frankie Neil	PTS	20	Jul 4, 1906	Naud Junction Pavilion, Los Angeles, California, U.S.	Retained world featherweight title
66	Draw	35–4–11 (16)	Kid Herman	PTS	20	May 11, 1906	Naud Junction Pavilion, Los Angeles, California, U.S.	
65	Win	35–4–10 (16)	Phil Logan	NWS	6	Mar 19, 1906	Washington S.C., Philadelphia, Pennsylvania, U.S.	
64	Win	35–4–10 (15)	Itsy Ryan	TKO	2 (3)	Mar 17, 1906	Metropolitan A.C., Manhattan, New York City, New York, U.S.	
63	Win	34–4–10 (15)	Art Edmunds	NWS	3	Mar 13, 1906	Marlborough A.C., Manhattan, New York City, New York, U.S.	
62	Win	34–4–10 (14)	Tony Bender	NWS	3	Mar 7, 1906	Consolidated A.C., Manhattan, New York City, New York, U.S.	
61	Win	34–4–10 (13)	Jimmy Walsh	PTS	15	Feb 22, 1906	Lincoln A.C., Chelsea, Massachusetts, U.S.	Won vacant world featherweight title
60	Win	33–4–10 (13)	Billy Maynard	TKO	10 (15)	Jan 22, 1906	Auditorium, Portland, Oregon, U.S.	
59	Win	32–4–10 (13)	Tony Bender	NWS	3	Jan 17, 1906	Olympia Boxing Club, Manhattan, New York City, New York, U.S.	
58	Win	32–4–10 (12)	Chester Goodwin	NWS	15	Jan 15, 1906	Summit A.C., Manhattan, New York City, New York, U.S.	
57	Win	32–4–10 (11)	Eddie Daly	NWS	3	Dec 19, 1905	Summit A.C., Manhattan, New York City, New York, U.S.	
56	Win	32–4–10 (10)	Barney Abel	NWS	3	Dec 5, 1905	Summit A.C., Manhattan, New York City, New York, U.S.	
55	Draw	32–4–10 (9)	Kid Sullivan	PTS	15	Nov 23, 1905	Eureka A.C., Baltimore, Maryland, U.S.	
54	Win	32–4–9 (9)	Tommy Mowatt	PTS	15	Nov 16, 1905	Germania Maennerchor Hall, Baltimore, Maryland, U.S.	
53	Win	31–4–9 (9)	Tommy Mowatt	NWS	6	Nov 8, 1905	Washington S.C., Philadelphia, Pennsylvania, U.S.	
52	Win	31–4–9 (8)	Chick Tucker	NWS	3	Oct 31, 1905	Summit A.C., Manhattan, New York City, New York, U.S.	
51	Loss	31–4–9 (7)	Young Erne	NWS	6	Oct 4, 1905	National A.C., Philadelphia, Pennsylvania, U.S.	
50	Win	31–4–9 (6)	Battling Nelson	NWS	6	May 22, 1905	National A.C., Philadelphia, Pennsylvania, U.S.	
49	Win	31–4–9 (5)	Harry Forbes	PTS	10	May 10, 1905	Light Guard Armory, Detroit, Michigan, U.S.	
48	Win	30–4–9 (5)	Jimmy Dunn	NWS	15	May 1, 1905	Broadway Theater, Sharon, Pennsylvania, U.S.	
47	Win	30–4–9 (4)	Eddie Hanlon	NWS	6	Feb 24, 1905	Industrial Hall, Philadelphia, Pennsylvania, U.S.	
46	Draw	30–4–9 (3)	Kid Goodman	PTS	15	Feb 22, 1905	Douglas A.C., Chelsea, Massachusetts, U.S.	
45	Win	30–4–8 (3)	Tommy Feltz	PTS	15	Feb 3, 1905	Germania Maennerchor Hall, Baltimore, Maryland, U.S.	
44	Win	29–4–8 (3)	Harlem Tommy Murphy	NWS	6	Jan 28, 1905	National A.C., Philadelphia, Pennsylvania, U.S.	
43	Win	29–4–8 (2)	Tommy Feltz	PTS	15	Dec 8, 1904	West End A.C., Saint Louis, Missouri, U.S.	
42	Win	28–4–8 (2)	Young Erne	PTS	20	Nov 19, 1904	West End A.C., Saint Louis, Missouri, U.S.	
41	Loss	27–4–8 (2)	Tommy Sullivan	KO	5 (20)	Oct 3, 1904	West End A.C., Saint Louis, Missouri, U.S.	Lost world featherweight title
40	Win	27–3–8 (2)	Johnny Reagan	PTS	15	Jun 23, 1904	West End A.C., Saint Louis, Missouri, U.S.	Retained world featherweight title
39	Loss	26–3–8 (2)	Jack McClelland	PTS	15	Jun 2, 1904	West End A.C., Saint Louis, Missouri, U.S.	
38	Win	26–2–8 (2)	Young Erne	NWS	6	May 14, 1904	National A.C., Philadelphia, Illinois, U.S.	
37	Win	26–2–8 (1)	Aurelio Herrera	PTS	6	Mar 28, 1904	American A.C., Chicago, Illinois, U.S.	
36	Win	25–2–8 (1)	Maurice Rauch	KO	6 (?)	Mar 23, 1904	Whittington A.C., Hot Springs, Arkansas, U.S.	
35	Win	24–2–8 (1)	Patsy Haley	KO	5 (20)	Mar 9, 1904	Whittington A.C., Hot Springs, Arkansas, U.S.	Retained world featherweight title
34	Draw	23–2–8 (1)	Young Erne	NWS	6	Feb 27, 1904	National A.C., Philadelphia, Pennsylvania, U.S.	
33	Win	23–2–8	Kid Herman	PTS	20	Feb 18, 1904	9th Ward A.C., Chicago, Illinois, U.S.	
32	Win	22–2–8	Harry Forbes	KO	5 (20)	Feb 1, 1904	West End A.C., Saint Louis, Missouri, U.S.	Retained world featherweight title
31	Draw	21–2–8	Harry Forbes	PTS	10	Jan 4, 1904	Indianapolis A.C., Indianapolis, Indiana, U.S.	Retained world featherweight title
30	Win	21–2–7	Johnny Reagan	PTS	20	Sep 3, 1903	West End A.C., Saint Louis, Missouri, U.S.	Won vacant world featherweight title
29	Win	20–2–7	Eddie Toy	PTS	20	Mar 12, 1903	Woodward's Pavilion, San Francisco, California, U.S.	
28	Draw	19–2–7	Eddie Hanlon	PTS	20	Jan 29, 1903	Woodward's Pavilion, San Francisco, California, U.S.	
27	Win	19–2–6	Buddy Ryan	PTS	6	Dec 8, 1902	American A.C., Chicago, Illinois, U.S.	
26	Draw	18–2–6	Harry Forbes	PTS	6	Nov 10, 1902	American A.C., Chicago, Illinois, U.S.	
25	Win	18–2–5	Aurelio Herrera	PTS	15	Oct 15, 1902	Exposition Building, Oakland, California, U.S.	
24	Win	17–2–5	Barney Abel	PTS	20	Sep 11, 1902	West End A.C., Saint Louis, Missouri, U.S.	
23	Win	16–2–5	Barney Abel	PTS	6	Aug 25, 1902	America A.C., Chicago, Illinois, U.S.	
22	Loss	15–2–5	Benny Yanger	TKO	19 (25)	Apr 24, 1902	West End A.C., Saint Louis, Missouri, U.S.	Yanger claimed vacant world featherweight title
21	Win	15–1–5	Kid Broad	PTS	20	Apr 10, 1902	West End A.C., Saint Louis, Missouri, U.S.	
20	Draw	14–1–5	Kid Broad	PTS	15	Mar 20, 1902	West End A.C., Saint Louis, Missouri, U.S.	
19	Loss	14–1–4	Harry Forbes	PTS	15	Nov 4, 1901	West End A.C., Saint Louis, Missouri, U.S.	
18	Win	14–0–4	George Dixon	PTS	15	Oct 28, 1901	West End A.C., Saint Louis, Missouri, U.S.	
17	Draw	13–0–4	George Dixon	PTS	20	Sep 12, 1901	Grand Opera House, Cripple Creek, Colorado, U.S.	
16	Draw	13–0–3	George Dixon	PTS	10	Aug 23, 1901	Coliseum Hall, Denver, Colorado, U.S.	
15	Win	13–0–2	Colorado Jack Dempsey	PTS	20	Aug 12, 1901	Rover's Club, Pueblo, Colorado, U.S.	
14	Win	12–0–2	Kid Decker	KO	3 (?)	Aug 1, 1901	Pueblo, Colorado, U.S.	
13	Draw	11–0–2	Scotty Williams	PTS	5	Jul 26, 1901	Coliseum Hall, Denver, Colorado, U.S.	
12	Win	11–0–1	Tommy Lewis	TKO	4 (5)	Jul 26, 1901	Coliseum Hall, Denver, Colorado, U.S.	
11	Win	10–0–1	William Henry	TKO	3 (5)	Jun 28, 1901	Colorado A.A., Denver, Colorado, U.S.	
10	Win	9–0–1	Jockey Bozeman	TKO	3 (10)	Jun 26, 1901	Wheel Club, Denver, Colorado, U.S.	
9	Win	8–0–1	Young Cassidy	TKO	2 (10)	Apr 26, 1901	Colorado A.C., Denver, Colorado, U.S.	
8	Win	7–0–1	Scotty Williams	KO	2 (5)	Apr 12, 1901	Colorado A.C., Denver, Colorado, U.S.	
7	Win	6–0–1	Kid Pelser	TKO	2 (5)	Mar 29, 1901	Colorado A.C., Denver, Colorado, U.S.	
6	Win	5–0–1	Tom Delaney	PTS	5	Mar 8, 1901	Colorado A.C., Denver, Colorado, U.S.	
5	Win	4–0–1	John Ross	TKO	4 (5)	Mar 1, 1901	Colorado A.C., Denver, Colorado, U.S.	
4	Draw	3–0–1	Young Buck	PTS	5	Feb 22, 1901	Colorado A.C., Denver, Colorado, U.S.	
3	Win	3–0	Young Buck	PTS	5	Feb 15, 1901	Colorado A.C., Denver, Colorado, U.S.	
2	Win	2–0	Mike Smith	KO	2 (?)	Jan 26, 1901	San Francisco, California, U.S.	
1	Win	1–0	Jockey Bozeman	PTS	10	Dec 20, 1900	Woodward's Pavilion, San Francisco, California, U.S.	

=== Unofficial record ===
154 fights	110 wins	17 losses
By knockout	38	4
By decision	72	13
Draws	25	
No contests	2	

Record with the inclusion of newspaper decisions in the win/loss/draw column.

No.	Result	Record	Opponent	Type	Round	Date	Location	Notes
154	Loss	110–17–25 (2)	Phil Virgets	TKO	4 (15)	Jan 8, 1917	Orleans A.C., New Orleans, Louisiana, U.S.	
153	Win	110–16–25 (2)	Frankie Callahan	KO	3 (10)	Sep 6, 1915	Gloversville, New York, U.S.	
152	Loss	109–16–25 (2)	Willie Beecher	NWS	10	Jul 24, 1913	Atlantic A.A., Rockaway Beach, Queens, New York City, New York, U.S.	
151	Win	109–15–25 (2)	George Chaney	PTS	15	Apr 28, 1913	Empire Theater, Baltimore, Maryland, U.S.	
150	NC	108–15–25 (2)	Benny Kaufman	NC	7 (10)	Apr 15, 1913	Orpheum Theater, Atlanta, Georgia, U.S.	Promoter Henry Norton stopped the bout and declared it a "no contest."
149	Win	108–15–25 (1)	Jimmy Walsh	NWS	10	Apr 3, 1913	Forty-Fourth Street A.C., Manhattan, New York City, New York, U.S.	
148	Win	107–15–25 (1)	Oliver Kirk	TKO	3 (10)	Mar 19, 1913	Forty-Fourth Street A.C., Manhattan, New York City, New York, U.S.	
147	Loss	106–15–25 (1)	Oliver Kirk	TKO	6 (8)	Nov 27, 1912	Saint Louis, Missouri, U.S.	
146	Draw	106–14–25 (1)	Jimmy Walsh	PTS	10	Sep 24, 1912	Pilgrim A.A., Boston, Massachusetts, U.S.	
145	Loss	106–14–24 (1)	Harry Thomas	NWS	10	Sep 13, 1912	Madison Square Garden, Manhattan, New York City, New York, U.S.	
144	Draw	106–13–24 (1)	Harlem Tommy Murphy	PTS	20	Aug 3, 1912	Coffroth's Mission Street Arena, Daly City, California, U.S.	
143	Win	106–13–23 (1)	Eddie Marino	PTS	10	Jul 3, 1912	Tacoma A.C., Tacoma, Washington, U.S.	
142	Win	105–13–23 (1)	Jimmy Carroll	KO	7 (20)	Mar 23, 1912	Capital AC, Sacramento, California, U.S.	
141	Loss	104–13–23 (1)	Harlem Tommy Murphy	PTS	20	Mar 9, 1912	Coffroth's Arena, Daly City, California, U.S.	
140	Loss	104–12–23 (1)	Johnny Kilbane	PTS	20	Feb 22, 1912	Arena, Vernon, California, U.S.	Lost world featherweight title
139	Loss	104–11–23 (1)	Knockout Brown	NWS	10	Jan 18, 1912	National S.C., Manhattan, New York City, New York, U.S.	
138	Win	104–10–23 (1)	Willie Jones	NWS	10	Dec 2, 1911	Gowanus A.C., Brooklyn, New York City, New York, U.S.	
137	Win	103–10–23 (1)	Patsy Kline	NWS	10	Dec 1, 1911	Navarre A.C., Brooklyn, New York City, New York, U.S.	
136	Win	102–10–23 (1)	Leo Johnson	TKO	5 (10)	Nov 23, 1911	Malvern A.C., Bronx, New York City, New York, U.S.	
135	Win	101–10–23 (1)	Willie Jones	NWS	10	Nov 20, 1911	Olympia Boxing Club, Manhattan, New York City, New York, U.S.	
134	Win	100–10–23 (1)	Young Johnny Cohen	NWS	10	Nov 15, 1911	Houston A.C., Manhattan, New York City, New York, U.S.	
133	Win	99–10–23 (1)	Herman Smith	NWS	10	Nov 3, 1911	International A.C., Buffalo, New York, U.S.	
132	Loss	98–10–23 (1)	Matt Wells	NWS	10	Sep 20, 1911	Madison A.C., Manhattan, New York City, New York, U.S.	
131	Win	98–9–23 (1)	Frankie Burns	NWS	10	Mar 31, 1911	New Amsterdam Opera House, Manhattan, New York City, New York, U.S.	
130	NC	97–9–23 (1)	Tommy Kilbane	NC	4 (10)	Jan 30, 1911	Eagles Club, Cleveland, Ohio, U.S.	Attell broke his right humeral bone when the fighters stumbled and fell
129	Draw	97–9–23	Billy Allen	NWS	10	Jan 23, 1911	Alhambra, Syracuse, New York, U.S.	
128	Win	97–9–22	Patsy Kline	NWS	10	Jan 13, 1911	New Amsterdam Opera House, Manhattan, New York City, New York, U.S.	
127	Win	96–9–22	Joe Coster	NWS	10	Jan 9, 1911	Vanderbilt A.C., Brooklyn, New York City, New York, U.S.	
126	Win	95–9–22	Philadelphia Pal Moore	NWS	10	Nov 30, 1910	Fairmont A.C., Bronx, New York City, New York, U.S.	
125	Draw	94–9–22	Frankie Conley	PTS	15	Nov 13, 1910	West Side A.C., Gretna, Louisiana, U.S.	Retained world featherweight title
124	Draw	94–9–21	Owen Moran	NWS	6	Nov 9, 1910	National A.C., Philadelphia, Pennsylvania, U.S.	
123	Win	94–9–20	Eddie Kelly	KO	4 (?)	Oct 28, 1910	Mohawk Valley A.C., Amsterdam, New York, U.S.	
122	Win	93–9–20	Biz Mackey	TKO	6 (10)	Oct 27, 1910	Brown's Gym, Manhattan, New York City, New York, U.S.	
121	Win	92–9–20	Johnny Kilbane	PTS	10	Oct 24, 1910	Hippodrome, Kansas City, Missouri, U.S.	
120	Draw	91–9–20	Jack White	PTS	15	Oct 10, 1910	Winnipeg, Manitoba, Canada	
119	Win	91–9–19	Frankie White	NWS	10	Oct 7, 1910	Hippodrome, Milwaukee, Wisconsin, U.S.	
118	Win	90–9–19	Charley White	NWS	10	Sep 16, 1910	Hippodrome, Milwaukee, Wisconsin, U.S.	
117	Win	89–9–19	Billy Lauder	KO	7 (15)	Sep 5, 1910	Mission Hill, Calgary, Alberta, Canada	Won lightweight championship of Calgary
116	Win	88–9–19	Eddie Marino	KO	3 (15)	Aug 22, 1910	Calgary, Alberta, Canada	
115	Win	87–9–19	Owen Moran	NWS	10	Jun 24, 1910	Naud Junction Pavilion, Los Angeles, California, U.S.	
114	Win	86–9–19	Harlem Tommy Murphy	NWS	10	May 20, 1910	New Amsterdam Opera House, National S.C., Manhattan, New York City, New York, U.S.	
113	Loss	85–9–19	Harlem Tommy Murphy	NWS	10	Apr 28, 1910	Empire A.C., Manhattan Casino, Manhattan, New York City, New York, U.S.	
112	Win	85–8–19	Owen Moran	NWS	10	Apr 1, 1910	Fairmont A.C., Bronx, New York City, New York, U.S.	
111	Win	84–8–19	Johnny Marto	NWS	10	Mar 18, 1910	New Amsterdam Opera House, National S.C., Manhattan, New York City, New York, U.S.	
110	Win	83–8–19	Harry Forbes	TKO	7 (?)	Feb 28, 1910	Troy, New York, U.S.	
109	Win	82–8–19	Frankie Neil	NWS	10	Feb 24, 1910	Long Acre A.C., Manhattan, New York City, New York, U.S.	
108	Win	81–8–19	Eddie Kelly	TKO	5 (15)	Jan 1, 1910	Southern A.C., Savannah, Georgia, U.S.	
107	Win	80–8–19	Charley White	PTS	8	Dec 6, 1909	Phoenix A.C., Memphis, Tennessee, U.S.	
106	Win	79–8–19	Jimmy Moran	PTS	8	Nov 22, 1909	Memphis, Tennessee, U.S.	Retained world featherweight title
105	Win	78–8–19	Patsy Kline	NWS	6	Oct 8, 1909	Nonpareil A.C., Philadelphia, Pennsylvania, U.S.	
104	Win	77–8–19	Buck 'Twin' Miller	NWS	6	Oct 5, 1909	Douglas A.C., Philadelphia, Pennsylvania, U.S.	
103	Win	76–8–19	Tommy O'Toole	PTS	12	Sep 14, 1909	Armory, Boston, Massachusetts, U.S.	Retained world featherweight title
102	Win	75–8–19	Eddie Kelly	NWS	6	Sep 6, 1909	Luna Park, Pittsburgh, Pennsylvania, U.S.	
101	Draw	74–8–19	Harry Stone	NWS	10	Aug 18, 1909	Convention Hall, Saratoga, New York, U.S.	
100	Win	74–8–18	Biz Mackey	TKO	8 (10)	Apr 26, 1909	Southern Theatre, Columbus, Ohio, U.S.	Retained world featherweight title
99	Win	73–8–18	Frankie White	KO	8 (20)	Mar 26, 1909	Dayton A.C., Dayton, Ohio, U.S.	
98	Win	72–8–18	Frankie Neil	NWS	10	Mar 23, 1909	Bedford A.C., Brooklyn, New York City, New York, U.S.	
97	Win	71–8–18	Patsy Kline	NWS	10	Mar 18, 1909	Whirlwind A.C., Brooklyn, New York City, New York, U.S.	
96	Win	70–8–18	Young Pierce	KO	6 (15)	Mar 10, 1909	Olympic Club, Essington, Pennsylvania, U.S.	
95	Win	69–8–18	Young Pierce	NWS	6	Mar 1, 1909	Washington S.C., Philadelphia, Pennsylvania, U.S.	
94	Loss	68–8–18	Jim Driscoll	NWS	10	Feb 19, 1909	National A.C., Manhattan, New York City, New York, U.S.	
93	Win	68–7–18	Eddie Kelly	TKO	7 (10)	Feb 4, 1909	Southern A.C., New Orleans, Louisiana, U.S.	Retained world featherweight title
92	Win	67–7–18	Freddie Weeks	KO	10 (20)	Jan 14, 1909	Goldfield A.C., Goldfield, Nevada, U.S.	Retained world featherweight title
91	Win	66–7–18	Biz Mackey	KO	8 (15)	Dec 29, 1908	West Side A.C., Gretna, Louisiana, U.S.	Retained world featherweight title
90	Draw	65–7–18	Ad Wolgast	NWS	10	Dec 11, 1908	Naud Junction Pavilion, Los Angeles, California, U.S.	
89	Loss	65–7–17	Freddie Welsh	PTS	15	Nov 25, 1908	Jeffries' Arena, Vernon, California, U.S.	
88	Draw	65–6–17	Owen Moran	PTS	23	Sep 7, 1908	Mission Street Arena, San Francisco, California, U.S.	Retained world featherweight title
87	Win	65–6–16	Eddie Marino	PTS	10	Jul 29, 1908	Sandpoint, California, U.S.	
86	Win	64–6–16	Matty Baldwin	NWS	6	Jun 26, 1908	Grand Union A.C., Manhattan, New York City, New York, U.S.	
85	Win	63–6–16	Tommy Sullivan	TKO	4 (20)	Apr 30, 1908	Coliseum, San Francisco, California, U.S.	
84	Win	62–6–16	Eddie Kelly	KO	8 (20)	Apr 20, 1908	Sound Beach, Washington, U.S.	Retained world featherweight title
83	Draw	61–6–16	Battling Nelson	PTS	15	Mar 31, 1908	Coliseum, San Francisco, California, U.S.	
82	Win	61–6–15	Eddie Kelly	TKO	7 (20)	Feb 28, 1908	Dreamland Rink, San Francisco, California, U.S.	Retained world featherweight title
81	Win	60–6–15	Frankie Neil	TKO	13 (20)	Jan 31, 1908	Dreamland Rink, San Francisco, California, U.S.	Retained world featherweight title
80	Draw	59–6–15	Owen Moran	PTS	25	Jan 1, 1908	Coffroth's Arena, Colma, California, U.S.	Retained world featherweight title
79	Win	59–6–14	Freddie Weeks	TKO	4 (20)	Oct 29, 1907	Naud Junction Pavilion, Los Angeles, California, U.S.	Retained world featherweight title
78	Draw	58–6–14	Tommy Sullivan	PTS	8	Sep 21, 1907	Physical Culture Farm, Alton, Illinois, U.S.	
77	Win	58–6–13	Jimmy Walsh	PTS	10	Sep 12, 1907	Auditorium (Virginia Ave.), Indianapolis, Indiana, U.S.	Retained world featherweight title
76	Win	57–6–13	Benny 'Kid' Solomon	PTS	20	May 24, 1907	Naud Junction Pavilion, Los Angeles, California, U.S.	Retained world featherweight title
75	Loss	56–6–13	Tommy O'Toole	NWS	6	Apr 17, 1907	National A.C., Philadelphia, Pennsylvania, U.S.	
74	Draw	56–5–13	Spike Robson	NWS	6	Apr 3, 1907	National A.C., Philadelphia, Pennsylvania, U.S.	
73	Win	56–5–12	Harry Baker	KO	8 (20)	Jan 18, 1907	Naud Junction Pavilion, Los Angeles, California, U.S.	Retained world featherweight title
72	Win	55–5–12	Jimmy Walsh	TKO	9 (20)	Dec 7, 1906	Naud Junction Pavilion, Los Angeles, California, U.S.	Retained world featherweight title
71	Win	54–5–12	Billy DeCoursey	PTS	15	Nov 16, 1906	National Athletic Club, San Diego, California, U.S.	Retained world featherweight title
70	Win	53–5–12	Harry Baker	PTS	20	Oct 30, 1906	Naud Junction Pavilion, Los Angeles, California, U.S.	Retained world featherweight title
69	Win	52–5–12	Frank Carsey	RTD	3 (15)	Sep 3, 1906	Davenport, Iowa, U.S.	
68	Win	51–5–12	Frank Carsey	PTS	15	Aug 15, 1906	Reed's Lake, Grand Rapids, Michigan, U.S.	
67	Win	50–5–12	Frankie Neil	PTS	20	Jul 4, 1906	Naud Junction Pavilion, Los Angeles, California, U.S.	Retained world featherweight title
66	Draw	49–5–12	Kid Herman	PTS	20	May 11, 1906	Naud Junction Pavilion, Los Angeles, California, U.S.	
65	Win	49–5–11	Phil Logan	NWS	6	Mar 19, 1906	Washington S.C., Philadelphia, Pennsylvania, U.S.	
64	Win	48–5–11	Itsy Ryan	TKO	2 (3)	Mar 17, 1906	Metropolitan A.C., Manhattan, New York City, New York, U.S.	
63	Win	47–5–11	Art Edmunds	NWS	3	Mar 13, 1906	Marlborough A.C., Manhattan, New York City, New York, U.S.	
62	Win	46–5–11	Tony Bender	NWS	3	Mar 7, 1906	Consolidated A.C., Manhattan, New York City, New York, U.S.	
61	Win	45–5–11	Jimmy Walsh	PTS	15	Feb 22, 1906	Lincoln A.C., Chelsea, Massachusetts, U.S.	Won vacant world featherweight title
60	Win	44–5–11	Billy Maynard	TKO	10 (15)	Jan 22, 1906	Auditorium, Portland, Oregon, U.S.	
59	Win	43–5–11	Tony Bender	NWS	3	Jan 17, 1906	Olympia Boxing Club, Manhattan, New York City, New York, U.S.	
58	Win	42–5–11	Chester Goodwin	NWS	15	Jan 15, 1906	Summit A.C., Manhattan, New York City, New York, U.S.	
57	Win	41–5–11	Eddie Daly	NWS	3	Dec 19, 1905	Summit A.C., Manhattan, New York City, New York, U.S.	
56	Win	40–5–11	Barney Abel	NWS	3	Dec 5, 1905	Summit A.C., Manhattan, New York City, New York, U.S.	
55	Draw	39–5–11	Kid Sullivan	PTS	15	Nov 23, 1905	Eureka A.C., Baltimore, Maryland, U.S.	
54	Win	39–5–10	Tommy Mowatt	PTS	15	Nov 16, 1905	Germania Maennerchor Hall, Baltimore, Maryland, U.S.	
53	Win	38–5–10	Tommy Mowatt	NWS	6	Nov 8, 1905	Washington S.C., Philadelphia, Pennsylvania, U.S.	
52	Win	37–5–10	Chick Tucker	NWS	3	Oct 31, 1905	Summit A.C., Manhattan, New York City, New York, U.S.	
51	Loss	36–5–10	Young Erne	NWS	6	Oct 4, 1905	National A.C., Philadelphia, Pennsylvania, U.S.	
50	Win	36–4–10	Battling Nelson	NWS	6	May 22, 1905	National A.C., Philadelphia, Pennsylvania, U.S.	
49	Win	35–4–10	Harry Forbes	PTS	10	May 10, 1905	Light Guard Armory, Detroit, Michigan, U.S.	
48	Win	34–4–10	Jimmy Dunn	NWS	15	May 1, 1905	Broadway Theater, Sharon, Pennsylvania, U.S.	
47	Win	33–4–10	Eddie Hanlon	NWS	6	Feb 24, 1905	Industrial Hall, Philadelphia, Pennsylvania, U.S.	
46	Draw	32–4–10	Kid Goodman	PTS	15	Feb 22, 1905	Douglas A.C., Chelsea, Massachusetts, U.S.	
45	Win	32–4–9	Tommy Feltz	PTS	15	Feb 3, 1905	Germania Maennerchor Hall, Baltimore, Maryland, U.S.	
44	Win	31–4–9	Harlem Tommy Murphy	NWS	6	Jan 28, 1905	National A.C., Philadelphia, Pennsylvania, U.S.	
43	Win	30–4–9	Tommy Feltz	PTS	15	Dec 8, 1904	West End A.C., Saint Louis, Missouri, U.S.	
42	Win	29–4–9	Young Erne	PTS	20	Nov 19, 1904	West End A.C., Saint Louis, Missouri, U.S.	
41	Loss	28–4–9	Tommy Sullivan	KO	5 (20)	Oct 3, 1904	West End A.C., Saint Louis, Missouri, U.S.	Lost world featherweight title
40	Win	28–3–9	Johnny Reagan	PTS	15	Jun 23, 1904	West End A.C., Saint Louis, Missouri, U.S.	Retained world featherweight title
39	Loss	27–3–9	Jack McClelland	PTS	15	Jun 2, 1904	West End A.C., Saint Louis, Missouri, U.S.	
38	Win	27–2–9	Young Erne	NWS	6	May 14, 1904	National A.C., Philadelphia, Illinois, U.S.	
37	Win	26–2–9	Aurelio Herrera	PTS	6	Mar 28, 1904	American A.C., Chicago, Illinois, U.S.	
36	Win	25–2–9	Maurice Rauch	KO	6 (?)	Mar 23, 1904	Whittington A.C., Hot Springs, Arkansas, U.S.	
35	Win	24–2–9	Patsy Haley	KO	5 (20)	Mar 9, 1904	Whittington A.C., Hot Springs, Arkansas, U.S.	Retained world featherweight title
34	Draw	23–2–9	Young Erne	NWS	6	Feb 27, 1904	National A.C., Philadelphia, Pennsylvania, U.S.	
33	Win	23–2–8	Kid Herman	PTS	20	Feb 18, 1904	9th Ward A.C., Chicago, Illinois, U.S.	
32	Win	22–2–8	Harry Forbes	KO	5 (20)	Feb 1, 1904	West End A.C., Saint Louis, Missouri, U.S.	Retained world featherweight title
31	Draw	21–2–8	Harry Forbes	PTS	10	Jan 4, 1904	Indianapolis A.C., Indianapolis, Indiana, U.S.	Retained world featherweight title
30	Win	21–2–7	Johnny Reagan	PTS	20	Sep 3, 1903	West End A.C., Saint Louis, Missouri, U.S.	Won vacant world featherweight title
29	Win	20–2–7	Eddie Toy	PTS	20	Mar 12, 1903	Woodward's Pavilion, San Francisco, California, U.S.	
28	Draw	19–2–7	Eddie Hanlon	PTS	20	Jan 29, 1903	Woodward's Pavilion, San Francisco, California, U.S.	
27	Win	19–2–6	Buddy Ryan	PTS	6	Dec 8, 1902	American A.C., Chicago, Illinois, U.S.	
26	Draw	18–2–6	Harry Forbes	PTS	6	Nov 10, 1902	American A.C., Chicago, Illinois, U.S.	
25	Win	18–2–5	Aurelio Herrera	PTS	15	Oct 15, 1902	Exposition Building, Oakland, California, U.S.	
24	Win	17–2–5	Barney Abel	PTS	20	Sep 11, 1902	West End A.C., Saint Louis, Missouri, U.S.	
23	Win	16–2–5	Barney Abel	PTS	6	Aug 25, 1902	America A.C., Chicago, Illinois, U.S.	
22	Loss	15–2–5	Benny Yanger	TKO	19 (25)	Apr 24, 1902	West End A.C., Saint Louis, Missouri, U.S.	Yanger claimed vacant world featherweight title
21	Win	15–1–5	Kid Broad	PTS	20	Apr 10, 1902	West End A.C., Saint Louis, Missouri, U.S.	
20	Draw	14–1–5	Kid Broad	PTS	15	Mar 20, 1902	West End A.C., Saint Louis, Missouri, U.S.	
19	Loss	14–1–4	Harry Forbes	PTS	15	Nov 4, 1901	West End A.C., Saint Louis, Missouri, U.S.	
18	Win	14–0–4	George Dixon	PTS	15	Oct 28, 1901	West End A.C., Saint Louis, Missouri, U.S.	
17	Draw	13–0–4	George Dixon	PTS	20	Sep 12, 1901	Grand Opera House, Cripple Creek, Colorado, U.S.	
16	Draw	13–0–3	George Dixon	PTS	10	Aug 23, 1901	Coliseum Hall, Denver, Colorado, U.S.	
15	Win	13–0–2	Colorado Jack Dempsey	PTS	20	Aug 12, 1901	Rover's Club, Pueblo, Colorado, U.S.	
14	Win	12–0–2	Kid Decker	KO	3 (?)	Aug 1, 1901	Pueblo, Colorado, U.S.	
13	Win	11–0–2	Tommy Lewis	TKO	4 (5)	Jul 26, 1901	Coliseum Hall, Denver, Colorado, U.S.	
12	Draw	10–0–2	Scotty Williams	PTS	5	Jul 26, 1901	Coliseum Hall, Denver, Colorado, U.S.	
11	Win	10–0–1	William Henry	TKO	3 (5)	Jun 28, 1901	Colorado A.A., Denver, Colorado, U.S.	
10	Win	9–0–1	Jockey Bozeman	TKO	3 (10)	Jun 26, 1901	Wheel Club, Denver, Colorado, U.S.	
9	Win	8–0–1	Young Cassidy	TKO	2 (10)	Apr 26, 1901	Colorado A.C., Denver, Colorado, U.S.	
8	Win	7–0–1	Scotty Williams	KO	2 (5)	Apr 12, 1901	Colorado A.C., Denver, Colorado, U.S.	
7	Win	6–0–1	Kid Pelser	TKO	2 (5)	Mar 29, 1901	Colorado A.C., Denver, Colorado, U.S.	
6	Win	5–0–1	Tom Delaney	PTS	5	Mar 8, 1901	Colorado A.C., Denver, Colorado, U.S.	
5	Win	4–0–1	John Ross	TKO	4 (5)	Mar 1, 1901	Colorado A.C., Denver, Colorado, U.S.	
4	Draw	3–0–1	Young Buck	PTS	5	Feb 22, 1901	Colorado A.C., Denver, Colorado, U.S.	
3	Win	3–0	Young Buck	PTS	5	Feb 15, 1901	Colorado A.C., Denver, Colorado, U.S.	
2	Win	2–0	Mike Smith	KO	2 (?)	Jan 26, 1901	San Francisco, California, U.S.	
1	Win	1–0	Jockey Bozeman	PTS	10	Dec 20, 1900	Woodward's Pavilion, San Francisco, California, U.S.	

== See also ==
- List of select Jewish boxers
- Black Sox Scandal

Achievements
Vacant Title last held by Young Corbett II	World Featherweight Champion; September 3, 1903 – February 22, 1912	Succeeded by Johnny Kilbane
