= Jimmy Walsh (American boxer) =

American boxer

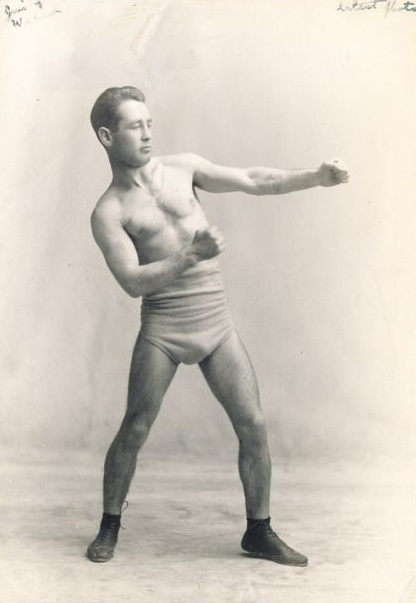
- Walsh as a young boxer circa 1912

Personal information
- Nationality: American
- Born: July 18, 1883
- Died: November 23, 1964 (aged 81)
- Height: 5 ft 2 in (1.57 m)
- Weight: Bantamweight

Boxing career
- Reach: 63.5 in (161 cm)
- Stance: Orthodox

Boxing record
- Total fights: 104; With the inclusion of newspaper decisions
- Wins: 57
- Win by KO: 14
- Losses: 19
- Draws: 27
- No contests: 1

Jimmy Walsh (July 18, 1883 – November 23, 1964) was an American boxer who claimed the World Bantamweight Championship on March 29, 1905, when he defeated Monte Attell, in a controversial six-round bout at the National Athletic Club in Philadelphia. His claim was recognized by the World Boxing Association, at the time the National Boxing Association. The fight ended in a disqualification called by the referee when Walsh sent a low right hook that landed below the belt of Attell. Most sources believed Walsh had led throughout the fight and that the blow should have been considered legal, which may be why Walsh was credited with the title by the National Boxing Association.

He unsuccessfully challenged Abe Attell twice and Johnny Kilbane once for the world featherweight championship. He was managed through most of his career by Eddie E. Keevin, who also managed Black heavyweight contender Sam Langford.

== Early boxing career ==
Boxing as an amateur as early as 1901, Walsh began boxing professionally around 1902 in the Boston area, winning all but one of his better publicized fights between April 1902 and March 1904.

Walsh fought Albert "Al" Delmont eleven times, winning seven, losing once, and drawing three times. At least five of these meetings were early in his career in 1902, and six of these bouts are recorded in his BoxRec record.

He fought Patsy McKenna twice in November and December 1902 in Boston and then Salem, Massachusetts, drawing in six rounds both times.

His victory against Johnny Sheehan on February 20, 1903, in Boston was booked as the "105 pound championship of the East" and was one of his first eight-round bouts, in an early career that took place almost exclusively at Boston boxing clubs and almost always in six-round bouts.

His bout against Willie Shumaker on March 26, 1903, at the Essex Athletic Club in Boston was billed as the American 105 pound title and ended in a ten-round points decision in his favor, though he was down in the first round.

Walsh's boxing dominance was becoming more apparent by 1904. On March 3, 1904, in a twelve-round bout at the Riverview Athletic Club with Jack Desmond in Lowell, Massachusetts, Walsh's opponent was in a dazed condition by the third round, and it became apparent to those present, Desmond "was not in Walsh's class." The draw ruling, in the opinion of the Boston Post, was a clear victory for Walsh as they wrote Desmond "nearly collapsed" by the final round.

=== First World Bantamweight title match ===
He competed for what could be considered his first shot at the World Bantamweight Title on April 18, 1904, in a twelve-round loss to London-born Brit Digger Stanley in London, billed as the 112 pound world title. Stanley was both the British and European Bantamweight Champion. Walsh met with Digger Stanley again on June 6, 1904, at the National Sporting Club in London in a twenty-round draw. The Wikes-Barre Times recognized the bout as the Bantamweight Championship and noted the purse was $1000. They met again in a fifteen-round draw bout in October 1905, in Chelsea, Massachusetts, with Walsh never defeating Stanley.

== Claiming the World Bantamweight Title ==
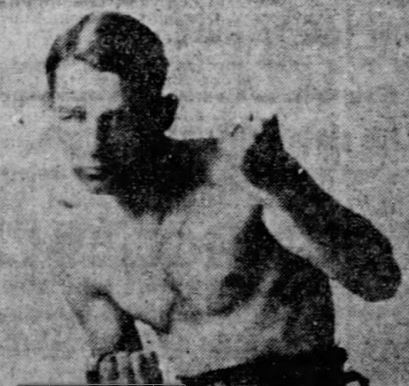
Walsh circa 1907

On March 29, 1905, Walsh first claimed the World Bantamweight Title in a bout against Monte Attell, brother of champion Abe, in Philadelphia that ended when the referee called a disqualification against Walsh in the sixth round. One source noted that Walsh, "had the better of the bout from the start", and that the blow which occurred two minutes into the sixth round was accidental. The National Boxing Association recognized Walsh's claim to the Bantamweight Championship. The St. Louis Dispatch, noted that according to most spectators ringside, the "blow was a fair one", though it was a "terrific right hook", and did notable injury to Attell. Controversy arose as to who won the bout as many observers considered the blow legal, and that "Walsh completely had Attell at his mercy throughout the entire contest."

Monte Attell and Walsh fought again on December 21, 1908, in a fifteen-round draw at the Colliseum in San Francisco. The bout was not considered a title fight because Walsh was unable to make the agreed upon weight. The Montreal Gazette noted that Walsh had the better of the last four rounds, with Attell having a slight edge in the first three rounds, but that the boxing was very close for much of the fight.

== Losing the World Bantamweight Title ==
On January 29, 1909, Walsh met Jimmy Reagan at the Dreamland Rink in San Francisco for a twelve-round World Bantamweight Title match. According to the Oakland Tribune, "Reagan led in every one of the fifteen rounds with Walsh and was entitled to the verdict," though admitting the "title was a very close one." Joe Woodman, Walsh's own manager, admitted that Walsh had been beaten in eight of the twelve rounds, though it was a surprise to much of the audience who believed that Reagan had been overmatched with Walsh in the days before the fight. Walsh was considered to have a more clever boxing form and finesse, particularly in the early rounds, but Reagan was the aggressor, delivering more blows, and taking the initiative in the final rounds. Reagan was only eighteen at the time of his victory over Walsh and had fought in relatively few major professional bouts.

== World Featherweight Championships ==
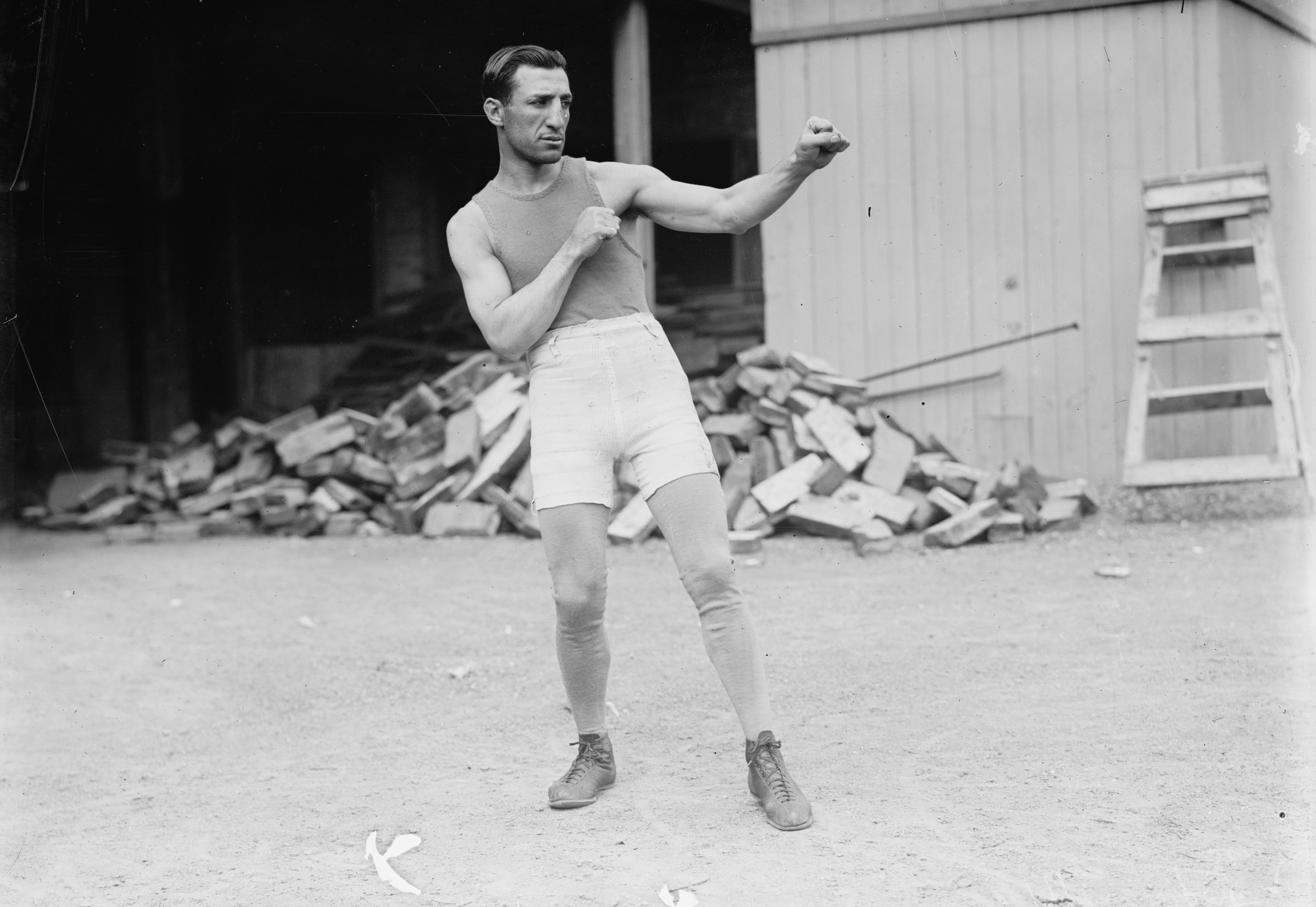
Featherweight Champion Abe Attell

Walsh lost to World Featherweight Champion Abe Attell three times in title matches; on September 12, 1907, for a ten-round decision in Indianapolis, on December 7, 1906, in a ten-round TKO in Los Angeles, and on February 22, 1906, for a fifteen-round decision in Chelsea, Massachusetts, in which Attell "badly punished" Walsh. Not surprisingly, Attell was the odds on favorite for the December 1906 fight. He met Attell twice in non-title matches on April 3, 1913, in New York in a ten-round loss by decision and on October 24, 1912, in a twelve-round draw in Boston. After the April 3, 1913, New York bout, Walsh's manager Eddie Keevin filed charges against Attell with the New York boxing commission that Attell had used eye gouging against Walsh in their bout.

=== Non-title fights in later career ===
In his November 9, 1909, twelve-round draw bout with Tommy O'Toole in Boston, Walsh put O'Toole down for the count of nine in the tenth round. Not surprisingly the Philadelphia Item gave him the newspaper decision.

On January 8, 1910, he fought six rounds to a draw at Pittsburgh's Old City Hall with Patsy Brannigan, though at least one newspaper gave him the decision.

On April 21, 1910, he was defeated by Pal Moore in ten rounds at the Empire Athletic Club in Harlem, New York, at least according to the respected newspaper decision of the New York Times. Moore was only seventeen at the time. It was a rare loss for Walsh, and according to one source, he lost at least six of the ten rounds. Many of Walsh's losses were to top rated boxers, and Moore had not yet distinguished himself to that extent. He would defeat Moore in a twelve-round points decision the following month in Boston.

On November 18, 1910, he defeated talented British boxer Sam Keller at New York's Fairmont Athletic club in a ten-round match. Walsh's victory was most clearly secured in the final round when Walsh landed repeated blows to the body. Walsh began showing an advantage by the seventh round.

On November 23, 1910, he lost decisively to Monte Attell, who had recently held the bantamweight championship, in a ten-round match in San Francisco. Walsh may have been overweight for the bout at 122 pounds, and appeared to have been most effective in the first round. Attell evaded his opponent with clever footwork and rocked Walsh, in the brutal bout, with blows to the jaw, mouth, and nose. Walsh was said to have been swinging wildly and ineffectively by the last four rounds.

=== Attempting World Featherweight Title ===
He fought Johnny Kilbane in a World Featherweight Title match on May 21, 1912, at the Pilgrim Athletic Club in Boston, Massachusetts, to a twelve-round draw decision. They had previously fought in a non-title match on May 30, 1911, in a twelve-round draw bout in Canton, Ohio, that was characterized as "full of clinches", with neither man "doing much hard work."

They fought for the last time on September 16, 1913, in a twelve-round bout dominated by Kilbane at the Atlas Athletic Association in Boston. As an important late career bout, Walsh, according to one source fought primarily defensively against the featherweight champion, who probably outweighed him in the bout, as several sources wrote that Kilbane was fighting as a lightweight, heavier than his normal featherweight status. Fighting defensively, one source noted "Walsh did not land half a dozen blows up to the tenth." As an indication of his cautious boxing technique, most of Walsh's blows were with his left throughout the bout. Only in the twelfth round was Walsh clearly seen as the aggressor, but by the end of the last round Kilbane was observed to have landed more blows than Walsh. Walsh was losing more frequently at his career neared its end, but was still boxing quality opponents, even if he was fighting cautiously.

On October 4, 1913, he fought the Jewish boxer Eddie Wallace in Brooklyn defeating him in a ten-round newspaper decision. Wallace was a skilled featherweight who would later meet the great Benny Leonard, Lew Tendler, Freddie Welsh and Johnny Dundee in his career, though without achieving an impressive win loss record.

One of his last bouts was with Johnny Ertle, in Milwaukee, on February 25, 1914, which he lost in an eight-round newspaper decision.

== Refereeing career ==
From 1920 to 1934, Walsh refereed 186 bouts. Despite never referring a world championship fight, he did referee bouts for world champions such as Battling Battalino, Benny Bass, Sammy Fuller, Charles 'Bud' Taylor, Kid Chocolate, Johnny Jadick, Isadore Schwartz, Fidel LaBarba, Frankie Genaro, Pancho Villa, Mike Ballerino, Johnny Dundee, Pete Latzo, and Kid Williams.

== Retirement from boxing ==
In late 1909, Walsh gave some boxing instruction to Charles Taft, son of President Taft, and to Theodore Roosevelt Jr., son of ex-President Teddy Roosevelt, who had taken boxing at Harvard. In February 1913, he was giving boxing instruction to the sons of several of Brookline, Massachusetts's wealthiest families.

Walsh retired from the ring in late 1914, having attained an exceptional record with only ten losses by decision in roughly 150 matches. According to one source, he worked as a head salesman for a cigar firm in Boston after retiring from boxing, and sent a son to the U.S. Naval Academy.

He died on November 23, 1964.

== Professional boxing record ==
All information in this section is derived from BoxRec, unless otherwise stated.

=== Official record ===
104 fights	33 wins	10 losses
By knockout	14	1
By decision	18	8
By disqualification	1	1
Draws	20	
No contests	1	
Newspaper decisions/draws	40	

All newspaper decisions are officially regarded as “no decision” bouts and are not counted in the win/loss/draw column.

No.	Result	Record	Opponent	Type	Round, time	Date	Location	Age	Notes
104	Loss	33–10–20 (41)	Johnny Ertle	NWS	8	Feb 25, 1914	26 years, 222 days	Milwaukee, Wisconsin, U.S.	
103	Draw	33–10–20 (40)	Young McAuliffe	NWS	10	Jan 1, 1914	26 years, 167 days	Bridgeport, Connecticut, U.S.	
102	Win	33–10–20 (39)	Joe Goldberg	NWS	10	Dec 9, 1913	26 years, 144 days	Alhambra, Syracuse, New York, U.S.	
101	Win	33–10–20 (38)	"Young" Louis Goldie	NWS	6	Nov 5, 1913	26 years, 110 days	Old City Hall, Pittsburgh, Pennsylvania, U.S.	
100	Draw	33–10–20 (37)	Willie Jones	NWS	10	Nov 1, 1913	26 years, 106 days	Irving A.C., New York City, New York, U.S.	
99	Win	33–10–20 (36)	Joe Goldberg	NWS	10	Oct 27, 1913	26 years, 101 days	Alhambra, Syracuse, New York, U.S.	
98	Win	33–10–20 (35)	Eddie Wallace	NWS	10	Oct 4, 1913	26 years, 78 days	Irving A.C., New York City, New York, U.S.	
97	Loss	33–10–20 (34)	Johnny Kilbane	PTS	12	Sep 16, 1913	26 years, 60 days	Atlas A.A., Boston, Massachusetts, U.S.	
96	Win	33–9–20 (34)	Jim Kenrick	NWS	10	Sep 2, 1913	26 years, 46 days	Atlantic Garden A.C., New York City, New York, U.S.	
95	Draw	33–9–20 (33)	Adolph Zotte	PTS	10	Jun 28, 1913	25 years, 345 days	Saltaire Arena, Salt Lake City, Utah, U.S.	
94	Win	33–9–19 (33)	Kid Julian	NWS	10	Apr 28, 1913	25 years, 284 days	Alhambra, Syracuse, New York, U.S.	
93	Win	33–9–19 (32)	Bobby Pittsley	NWS	10	Apr 7, 1913	25 years, 263 days	Alhambra, Syracuse, New York, U.S.	
92	Loss	33–9–19 (31)	Abe Attell	NWS	10	Apr 3, 1913	25 years, 259 days	Forty-Fourth Street A.C., New York City, New York, U.S.	
91	Draw	33–9–19 (30)	Tommy Dixon	NWS	8	Nov 13, 1912	25 years, 118 days	Windsor, Ontario, Canada	
90	Draw	33–9–19 (29)	Abe Attell	PTS	12	Oct 24, 1912	25 years, 98 days	Pilgrim A.A., Boston, Massachusetts, U.S.	
89	Draw	33–9–18 (29)	Patsy Brannigan	PTS	10	Aug 14, 1912	25 years, 27 days	Pilgrim A.A., Boston, Massachusetts, U.S.	
88	Draw	33–9–17 (29)	Johnny Kilbane	PTS	12	May 21, 1912	24 years, 308 days	Pilgrim A.A., Boston, Massachusetts, U.S.	For world featherweight title
87	NC	33–9–16 (29)	Joe Coster	NC	8 (10)	Apr 10, 1912	24 years, 267 days	Manhattan Casino, New York City, New York, U.S.	Both fighters DQ'd for holding
86	Draw	33–9–16 (28)	Eddie Sherman	PTS	6 (8)	Mar 18, 1912	24 years, 244 days	Central A.C., Boston, Massachusetts, U.S.	Attendance & receipts were so small the bout was stopped short; Results unclear
85	Win	33–9–15 (28)	Alf Lynch	NWS	8	Jan 3, 1912	24 years, 169 days	American A.C., Boston, Massachusetts, U.S.	
84	Win	33–9–15 (27)	Jim Kenrick	NWS	8	Dec 11, 1911	24 years, 146 days	American A.C., Boston, Massachusetts, U.S.	
83	Win	33–9–15 (26)	Fred Landowne	TKO	7 (10)	Jun 14, 1911	23 years, 331 days	Island Stadium, Toronto, Ontario, Canada	
82	Draw	32–9–15 (26)	Johnny Kilbane	NWS	12	May 30, 1911	23 years, 316 days	Canton Auditorium, Canton, Ohio, U.S.	
81	Draw	32–9–15 (25)	Al Delmont	PTS	12	May 16, 1911	23 years, 302 days	Armory A.A., Boston, Massachusetts, U.S.	
80	Draw	32–9–14 (25)	Bert O'Donnell	NWS	6	Jan 27, 1911	23 years, 193 days	Wilkes-Barre, Pennsylvania, U.S.	
79	Loss	32–9–14 (24)	Joe Coster	NWS	10	Dec 19, 1910	23 years, 154 days	Marathon A.C., New York City, New York, U.S.	
78	Loss	32–9–14 (23)	Monte Attell	PTS	10	Nov 23, 1910	23 years, 128 days	Kansas City, Missouri, U.S.	For world bantamweight title
77	Win	32–8–14 (23)	Sam Kellar	NWS	10	Nov 15, 1910	23 years, 120 days	Fairmont A.C., New York City, New York, U.S.	
76	Win	32–8–14 (22)	Young Britt	PTS	10	Sep 20, 1910	23 years, 64 days	Armory, Boston, Massachusetts, U.S.	
75	Win	31–8–14 (22)	Philadelphia Pal Moore	PTS	12	May 31, 1910	22 years, 317 days	Arena (Armory A.A.), Boston, Massachusetts, U.S.	
74	Loss	30–8–14 (22)	Philadelphia Pal Moore	NWS	10	Apr 21, 1910	22 years, 277 days	Empire A.C., New York City, New York, U.S.	
73	Win	30–8–14 (21)	Eddie Greenwald	NWS	10	Apr 8, 1910	22 years, 264 days	Milwaukee A.C., Milwaukee, Wisconsin, U.S.	
72	Win	30–8–14 (20)	Young Britt	NWS	10	Apr 4, 1910	22 years, 260 days	American A.C., Schenectady, Pennsylvania, U.S.	
71	Draw	30–8–14 (19)	Al Delmont	PTS	8	Mar 15, 1910	22 years, 240 days	Armory, Boston, Massachusetts, U.S.	
70	Win	30–8–13 (19)	Joe Coster	NWS	6	Feb 10, 1910	22 years, 207 days	American A.C., Boston, Massachusetts, U.S.	
69	Win	30–8–13 (18)	Patsy Brannigan	NWS	6	Jan 28, 1910	22 years, 194 days	Old City Hall, Pittsburgh, Pennsylvania, U.S.	
68	Loss	30–8–13 (17)	Alf Lynch	NWS	10	Dec 23, 1909	22 years, 158 days	Quebec City, Quebec, Canada	
67	Win	30–8–13 (16)	Billy Allen	NWS	10	Dec 13, 1909	22 years, 148 days	Alhambra, Syracuse, New York, U.S.	
66	Draw	30–8–13 (15)	Tommy O'Toole	PTS	12	Nov 9, 1909	22 years, 114 days	Armory, Boston, Massachusetts, U.S.	
65	Win	30–8–12 (15)	Johnny Whittaker	NWS	6	Jul 13, 1909	21 years, 360 days	Bijou Theater, Pittsburgh, Pennsylvania, U.S.	
64	Draw	30–8–12 (14)	Digger Stanley	PTS	15	May 24, 1909	21 years, 310 days	National Sporting Club, Covent Garden, London, England	
63	Loss	30–8–11 (14)	"Young" George Pierce	NWS	6	Mar 27, 1909	21 years, 252 days	National A.C., Philadelphia, Pennsylvania, U.S.	
62	Loss	30–8–11 (13)	Jimmy Reagan	PTS	12	Jan 29, 1909	21 years, 195 days	Dreamland Rink, San Francisco, California, U.S.	Lost world bantamweight title claim
61	Draw	30–7–11 (13)	Monte Attell	PTS	15	Dec 21, 1908	21 years, 156 days	Coliseum, San Francisco, California, U.S.	Retained world bantamweight title claim; Both fighters claimed the title
60	Win	30–7–10 (13)	Young Britt	PTS	15	Oct 9, 1908	21 years, 83 days	Germania Maennerchor Hall, Baltimore, Maryland, U.S.	Billed for world bantamweight title claim; Later found out to be an over the weight bout
59	Loss	29–7–10 (13)	Joe Wagner	NWS	6	Sep 24, 1908	21 years, 68 days	Whirlwind A.C., New York City, New York, U.S.	
58	Win	29–7–10 (12)	Jimmy Carroll	TKO	11 (15)	Jun 26, 1908	20 years, 344 days	Dreamland Rink, San Francisco, California, U.S.	Retained world bantamweight title claim
57	Win	28–7–10 (12)	Eddie Menney	NWS	10	May 19, 1908	20 years, 306 days	McCarey's Pavilion, Los Angeles, California, U.S.	
56	Loss	28–7–10 (11)	"Young" George Pierce	NWS	6	Apr 6, 1908	20 years, 263 days	West End A.C., Philadelphia, Pennsylvania, U.S.	
55	Draw	28–7–10 (10)	Al Delmont	PTS	12	Mar 31, 1908	21 years, 105 days	Winnisimmett Club, Chelsea, Massachusetts, U.S.	Retained world bantamweight title claim
54	Win	28–7–9 (10)	Babe Cullen	PTS	10	Oct 1, 1907	20 years, 75 days	Winnisimmett Club, Chelsea, Massachusetts, U.S.	
53	Loss	27–7–9 (10)	Abe Attell	PTS	10	Sep 12, 1907	20 years, 56 days	Auditorium (Virginia Ave.), Indianapolis, Indiana, U.S.	For world featherweight title
52	Win	27–6–9 (10)	Young Erlenborn	PTS	12	Sep 2, 1907	20 years, 46 days	Winnismet Club, Chelsea, Massachusetts, U.S.	
51	Loss	26–6–9 (10)	Freddie Weeks	PTS	10	Jun 18, 1907	19 years, 335 days	Denver A.C., Denver, Colorado, U.S.	
50	Win	26–5–9 (10)	Eddie Menney	PTS	10	Mar 8, 1907	19 years, 233 days	Naud Junction Pavilion, Los Angeles, California, U.S.	Claimed 115lbs world title
49	Loss	25–5–9 (10)	Abe Attell	TKO	9 (20)	Dec 7, 1906	19 years, 142 days	Naud Junction Pavilion, Los Angeles, California, U.S.	For world featherweight title
48	Win	25–4–9 (10)	Willie Moody	NWS	6	Apr 9, 1906	18 years, 265 days	Washington S.C., Philadelphia, Pennsylvania, U.S.	
47	Loss	25–4–9 (9)	Abe Attell	PTS	15	Feb 22, 1906	18 years, 219 days	Lincoln A.C., Chelsea, Massachusetts, U.S.	For world featherweight title
46	Win	25–3–9 (9)	Jack Langdon	NWS	6	Feb 19, 1906	18 years, 216 days	Washington S.C., Philadelphia, Pennsylvania, U.S.	
45	Win	25–3–9 (8)	Johnny Reagan	KO	5 (15)	Feb 12, 1906	18 years, 209 days	Pythian Rink, Chelsea, Massachusetts, U.S.	
44	Win	24–3–9 (8)	Tommy O'Toole	NWS	6	Jan 27, 1906	18 years, 193 days	National A.C., Philadelphia, Pennsylvania, U.S.	
43	Win	24–3–9 (7)	Digger Stanley	PTS	15	Oct 20, 1905	18 years, 94 days	Pythian Rink, Chelsea, Massachusetts, U.S.	Retained world bantamweight title claim
42	Draw	23–3–9 (7)	Tommy O'Toole	NWS	6	Sep 23, 1905	18 years, 67 days	National A.C., Philadelphia, Pennsylvania, U.S.	
41	Loss	23–3–9 (6)	Tommy O'Toole	NWS	6	Sep 4, 1905	18 years, 48 days	National A.C., Philadelphia, Pennsylvania, U.S.	
40	Win	23–3–9 (5)	Willie Gibbs	PTS	15	May 23, 1905	17 years, 309 days	Douglas A.C., Chelsea, Massachusetts, U.S.	
39	Win	22–3–9 (5)	Phil Logan	NWS	6	May 1, 1905	17 years, 287 days	Washington S.C., Philadelphia, Pennsylvania, U.S.	
38	Win	22–3–9 (4)	Danny Dougherty	NWS	6	Mar 31, 1905	17 years, 256 days	Knickerbocker A.C., Philadelphia, Pennsylvania, U.S.	
37	Loss	22–3–9 (3)	Monte Attell	DQ	6 (6)	Mar 29, 1905	17 years, 254 days	National A.C., Philadelphia, Pennsylvania, U.S.	Claimed world bantamweight title; Walsh claims title after leading until DQ'd for a low blow
36	Win	22–2–9 (3)	Joe Wagner	TKO	2 (6)	Mar 25, 1905	17 years, 250 days	National A.C., Philadelphia, Pennsylvania, U.S.	
35	Win	21–2–9 (3)	Monte Attell	NWS	6	Mar 20, 1905	17 years, 245 days	Washington S.C., Philadelphia, Pennsylvania, U.S.	
34	Win	21–2–9 (2)	Tommy Feltz	DQ	11 (15)	Mar 7, 1905	17 years, 232 days	Douglas A.C., Chelsea, Massachusetts, U.S.	
33	Win	20–2–9 (2)	Harry Brodigan	KO	1 (10), 2:30	Dec 26, 1904	17 years, 161 days	North Street Rink, Salem, Massachusetts, U.S.	
32	Win	19–2–9 (2)	Bob Kendrick	NWS	6	Oct 8, 1904	17 years, 82 days	National A.C., Philadelphia, Pennsylvania, U.S.	
31	Draw	19–2–9 (1)	Danny Dougherty	NWS	6	Sep 17, 1904	17 years, 61 days	National A.C., Philadelphia, Pennsylvania, U.S.	
30	Draw	19–2–9	Digger Stanley	PTS	15	Jun 6, 1904	16 years, 324 days	National Sporting Club, Covent Garden, London, England	Billed 112lbs world title
29	Loss	19–2–8	Digger Stanley	PTS	15	Apr 18, 1904	16 years, 275 days	National Sporting Club, Covent Garden, London, England	Billed 8st world title
28	Draw	19–1–8	Jack Desmond	PTS	12	Mar 2, 1904	16 years, 228 days	Riverview A.C., Dracut, Massachusetts, U.S.	
27	Win	19–1–7	Tommy Quigley	KO	13 (?)	Feb 23, 1904	16 years, 220 days	Central A.C., Boston, Massachusetts, U.S.	
26	Win	18–1–7	Jim Connolly	TKO	1 (?)	Feb 20, 1904	16 years, 217 days	Central A.C., Boston, Massachusetts, U.S.	
25	Win	17–1–7	Kid Williams	TKO	2 (12)	Feb 6, 1904	16 years, 203 days	Central A.C., Boston, Massachusetts, U.S.	
24	Win	16–1–7	Kid Paul	KO	5 (?)	Jan 9, 1904	16 years, 175 days	Central A.C., Boston, Massachusetts, U.S.	
23	Win	15–1–7	Harry Brown	TKO	9 (?)	Nov 21, 1903	16 years, 126 days	Central A.C., Boston, Massachusetts, U.S.	
22	Win	14–1–7	Young Hines	KO	2 (?)	Nov 9, 1903	16 years, 114 days	Allston A.C., Boston, Massachusetts, U.S.	
21	Win	13–1–7	Eddie Carr	TKO	10 (?)	Oct 2, 1903	16 years, 76 days	Lenox A.C., Boston, Massachusetts, U.S.	
20	Win	12–1–7	Al Delmont	PTS	12	Sep 11, 1903	16 years, 55 days	Lenox A.C., Boston, Massachusetts, U.S.	
19	Win	11–1–7	Terry Edwards	PTS	12	May 6, 1903	15 years, 292 days	Essex A.C., Boston, Massachusetts, U.S.	
18	Win	10–1–7	Terry Edwards	PTS	10	Apr 24, 1903	15 years, 280 days	Lenox A.C., Boston, Massachusetts, U.S.	
17	Win	9–1–7	Johnny Powers	PTS	10	Apr 17, 1903	15 years, 273 days	Lenox A.C., Boston, Massachusetts, U.S.	
16	Win	8–1–7	Willie Schumacher	PTS	10	Mar 26, 1903	15 years, 251 days	Essex A.C., Boston, Massachusetts, U.S.	Billed American bantamweight title
15	Win	7–1–7	Johnny Powers	PTS	10	Mar 17, 1903	15 years, 242 days	Tammany A.C., Roxbury, Massachusetts, U.S.	
14	Win	6–1–7	Johnny Kid Sheehan	PTS	8	Feb 20, 1903	15 years, 217 days	Lenox A.C., Boston, Massachusetts, U.S.	Claimed bantamweight championship of the East
13	Win	5–1–7	Young Brooks	PTS	6	Jan 28, 1903	15 years, 194 days	Lenox A.C., Boston, Massachusetts, U.S.	
12	Win	4–1–7	Kid Terrell	KO	? (6)	Jan 23, 1903	15 years, 189 days	Essex A.C., Boston, Massachusetts, U.S.	
11	Win	3–1–7	Patsy McKenna	PTS	6	Dec 30, 1902	15 years, 165 days	Essex A.C., Boston, Massachusetts, U.S.	
10	Win	2–1–7	Denny Ryan	KO	2 (?)	Dec 25, 1902	15 years, 160 days	Lenox A.C., Boston, Massachusetts, U.S.	
9	Draw	1–1–7	Patsy McKenna	PTS	6	Dec 19, 1902	15 years, 154 days	Hoffman A.C., Salem, Massachusetts, U.S.	
8	Draw	1–1–6	Patsy McKenna	PTS	6	Nov 7, 1902	15 years, 112 days	Lenox A.C., Boston, Massachusetts, U.S.	
7	Draw	1–1–5	Al Delmont	PTS	6	Oct 17, 1902	15 years, 91 days	Boston, Massachusetts, U.S.	
6	Draw	1–1–4	Johnny Lynch	PTS	6	Oct 13, 1902	15 years, 87 days	Cambridge A.A., Cambridge, Massachusetts, U.S.	
5	Draw	1–1–3	Al Delmont	PTS	6	Oct 7, 1902	15 years, 81 days	Lenox A.C., Boston, Massachusetts, U.S.	
4	Draw	1–1–2	Jimmy Malloy	PTS	6	Aug 20, 1902	15 years, 33 days	Wilkens A.C., Providence, Rhode Island, U.S.	
3	Loss	1–1–1	Al Delmont	PTS	10	Aug 1, 1902	15 years, 14 days	King Philip Club, Providence, Rhode Island, U.S.	
2	Draw	1–0–1	Al Delmont	PTS	6	Jun 25, 1902	14 years, 342 days	East Boston A.A., Boston, Massachusetts, U.S.	
1	Win	1–0	Al Delmont	PTS	6	Apr 19, 1902	14 years, 275 days	Lenox A.C., Boston, Massachusetts, U.S.	

=== Unofficial record ===
104 fights	57 wins	19 losses
By knockout	14	1
By decision	42	17
By disqualification	1	1
Draws	27	
No contests	1	

Record with the inclusion of newspaper decisions in the win/loss/draw column.

No.	Result	Record	Opponent	Type	Round	Date	Age	Location	Notes
104	Loss	57–19–27 (1)	Johnny Ertle	NWS	8	Feb 25, 1914	26 years, 222 days	Milwaukee, Wisconsin, U.S.	
103	Draw	57–18–27 (1)	Young McAuliffe	NWS	10	Jan 1, 1914	26 years, 167 days	Bridgeport, Connecticut, U.S.	
102	Win	57–18–26 (1)	Joe Goldberg	NWS	10	Dec 9, 1913	26 years, 144 days	Alhambra, Syracuse, New York, U.S.	
101	Win	56–18–26 (1)	"Young" Louis Goldie	NWS	6	Nov 5, 1913	26 years, 110 days	Old City Hall, Pittsburgh, Pennsylvania, U.S.	
100	Draw	55–18–26 (1)	Willie Jones	NWS	10	Nov 1, 1913	26 years, 106 days	Irving A.C., New York City, New York, U.S.	
99	Win	55–18–25 (1)	Joe Goldberg	NWS	10	Oct 27, 1913	26 years, 101 days	Alhambra, Syracuse, New York, U.S.	
98	Win	54–18–25 (1)	Eddie Wallace	NWS	10	Oct 4, 1913	26 years, 78 days	Irving A.C., New York City, New York, U.S.	
97	Loss	53–18–25 (1)	Johnny Kilbane	PTS	12	Sep 16, 1913	26 years, 60 days	Atlas A.A., Boston, Massachusetts, U.S.	
96	Win	53–17–25 (1)	Jim Kenrick	NWS	10	Sep 2, 1913	26 years, 46 days	Atlantic Garden A.C., New York City, New York, U.S.	
95	Draw	52–17–25 (1)	Adolph Zotte	PTS	10	Jun 28, 1913	25 years, 345 days	Saltaire Arena, Salt Lake City, Utah, U.S.	
94	Win	52–17–24 (1)	Kid Julian	NWS	10	Apr 28, 1913	25 years, 284 days	Alhambra, Syracuse, New York, U.S.	
93	Win	51–17–24 (1)	Bobby Pittsley	NWS	10	Apr 7, 1913	25 years, 263 days	Alhambra, Syracuse, New York, U.S.	
92	Loss	50–17–24 (1)	Abe Attell	NWS	10	Apr 3, 1913	25 years, 259 days	Forty-Fourth Street A.C., New York City, New York, U.S.	
91	Draw	50–16–24 (1)	Tommy Dixon	NWS	8	Nov 13, 1912	25 years, 118 days	Windsor, Ontario, Canada	
90	Draw	50–16–23 (1)	Abe Attell	PTS	12	Oct 24, 1912	25 years, 98 days	Pilgrim A.A., Boston, Massachusetts, U.S.	
89	Draw	50–16–22 (1)	Patsy Brannigan	PTS	10	Aug 14, 1912	25 years, 27 days	Pilgrim A.A., Boston, Massachusetts, U.S.	
88	Draw	50–16–21 (1)	Johnny Kilbane	PTS	12	May 21, 1912	24 years, 308 days	Pilgrim A.A., Boston, Massachusetts, U.S.	For world featherweight title
87	NC	50–16–20 (1)	Joe Coster	NC	8 (10)	Apr 10, 1912	24 years, 267 days	Manhattan Casino, New York City, New York, U.S.	Both fighters DQ'd for holding
86	Draw	50–16–20	Eddie Sherman	PTS	6 (8)	Mar 18, 1912	24 years, 244 days	Central A.C., Boston, Massachusetts, U.S.	Attendance & receipts were so small the bout was stopped short; Results unclear
85	Win	50–16–19	Alf Lynch	NWS	8	Jan 3, 1912	24 years, 169 days	American A.C., Boston, Massachusetts, U.S.	
84	Win	49–16–19	Jim Kenrick	NWS	8	Dec 11, 1911	24 years, 146 days	American A.C., Boston, Massachusetts, U.S.	
83	Win	48–16–19	Fred Landowne	TKO	7 (10)	Jun 14, 1911	23 years, 331 days	Island Stadium, Toronto, Ontario, Canada	
82	Draw	47–16–19	Johnny Kilbane	NWS	12	May 30, 1911	23 years, 316 days	Canton Auditorium, Canton, Ohio, U.S.	
81	Draw	47–16–18	Al Delmont	PTS	12	May 16, 1911	23 years, 302 days	Armory A.A., Boston, Massachusetts, U.S.	
80	Draw	47–16–17	Bert O'Donnell	NWS	6	Jan 27, 1911	23 years, 193 days	Wilkes-Barre, Pennsylvania, U.S.	
79	Loss	47–16–16	Joe Coster	NWS	10	Dec 19, 1910	23 years, 154 days	Marathon A.C., New York City, New York, U.S.	
78	Loss	47–15–16	Monte Attell	PTS	10	Nov 23, 1910	23 years, 128 days	Kansas City, Missouri, U.S.	For world bantamweight title
77	Win	47–14–16	Sam Kellar	NWS	10	Nov 15, 1910	23 years, 120 days	Fairmont A.C., New York City, New York, U.S.	
76	Win	46–14–16	Young Britt	PTS	10	Sep 20, 1910	23 years, 64 days	Armory, Boston, Massachusetts, U.S.	
75	Win	45–14–16	Philadelphia Pal Moore	PTS	12	May 31, 1910	22 years, 317 days	Arena (Armory A.A.), Boston, Massachusetts, U.S.	
74	Loss	44–14–16	Philadelphia Pal Moore	NWS	10	Apr 21, 1910	22 years, 277 days	Empire A.C., New York City, New York, U.S.	
73	Win	44–13–16	Eddie Greenwald	NWS	10	Apr 8, 1910	22 years, 264 days	Milwaukee A.C., Milwaukee, Wisconsin, U.S.	
72	Win	43–13–16	Young Britt	NWS	10	Apr 4, 1910	22 years, 260 days	American A.C., Schenectady, Pennsylvania, U.S.	
71	Draw	42–13–16	Al Delmont	PTS	8	Mar 15, 1910	22 years, 240 days	Armory, Boston, Massachusetts, U.S.	
70	Win	42–13–15	Joe Coster	NWS	6	Feb 10, 1910	22 years, 207 days	American A.C., Boston, Massachusetts, U.S.	
69	Win	41–13–15	Patsy Brannigan	NWS	6	Jan 28, 1910	22 years, 194 days	Old City Hall, Pittsburgh, Pennsylvania, U.S.	
68	Loss	40–13–15	Alf Lynch	NWS	10	Dec 23, 1909	22 years, 158 days	Quebec City, Quebec, Canada	
67	Win	40–12–15	Billy Allen	NWS	10	Dec 13, 1909	22 years, 148 days	Alhambra, Syracuse, New York, U.S.	
66	Draw	39–12–15	Tommy O'Toole	PTS	12	Nov 9, 1909	22 years, 114 days	Armory, Boston, Massachusetts, U.S.	
65	Win	39–12–14	Johnny Whittaker	NWS	6	Jul 13, 1909	21 years, 360 days	Bijou Theater, Pittsburgh, Pennsylvania, U.S.	
64	Draw	38–12–14	Digger Stanley	PTS	15	May 24, 1909	21 years, 310 days	National Sporting Club, Covent Garden, London, England	
63	Loss	38–12–13	"Young" George Pierce	NWS	6	Mar 27, 1909	21 years, 252 days	National A.C., Philadelphia, Pennsylvania, U.S.	
62	Loss	38–11–13	Jimmy Reagan	PTS	12	Jan 29, 1909	21 years, 195 days	Dreamland Rink, San Francisco, California, U.S.	Lost world bantamweight title claim
61	Draw	38–10–13	Monte Attell	PTS	15	Dec 21, 1908	21 years, 156 days	Coliseum, San Francisco, California, U.S.	Retained world bantamweight title claim; Both fighters claimed the title
60	Win	38–10–12	Young Britt	PTS	15	Oct 9, 1908	21 years, 83 days	Germania Maennerchor Hall, Baltimore, Maryland, U.S.	Billed for world bantamweight title claim; Later found out to be an over the weight bout
59	Loss	37–10–12	Joe Wagner	NWS	6	Sep 24, 1908	21 years, 68 days	Whirlwind A.C., New York City, New York, U.S.	
58	Win	37–9–12	Jimmy Carroll	TKO	11 (15)	Jun 26, 1908	20 years, 344 days	Dreamland Rink, San Francisco, California, U.S.	Retained world bantamweight title claim
57	Win	36–9–12	Eddie Menney	NWS	10	May 19, 1908	20 years, 306 days	McCarey's Pavilion, Los Angeles, California, U.S.	
56	Loss	35–9–12	"Young" George Pierce	NWS	6	Apr 6, 1908	20 years, 263 days	West End A.C., Philadelphia, Pennsylvania, U.S.	
55	Draw	35–8–12	Al Delmont	PTS	12	Mar 31, 1908	21 years, 105 days	Winnisimmett Club, Chelsea, Massachusetts, U.S.	Retained world bantamweight title claim
54	Win	35–8–11	Babe Cullen	PTS	10	Oct 1, 1907	20 years, 75 days	Winnisimmett Club, Chelsea, Massachusetts, U.S.	
53	Loss	34–8–11	Abe Attell	PTS	10	Sep 12, 1907	20 years, 56 days	Auditorium (Virginia Ave.), Indianapolis, Indiana, U.S.	For world featherweight title
52	Win	34–7–11	Young Erlenborn	PTS	12	Sep 2, 1907	20 years, 46 days	Winnismet Club, Chelsea, Massachusetts, U.S.	
51	Loss	33–7–11	Freddie Weeks	PTS	10	Jun 18, 1907	19 years, 335 days	Denver A.C., Denver, Colorado, U.S.	
50	Win	33–6–11	Eddie Menney	PTS	10	Mar 8, 1907	19 years, 233 days	Naud Junction Pavilion, Los Angeles, California, U.S.	Claimed 115lbs world title
49	Loss	32–6–11	Abe Attell	TKO	9 (20)	Dec 7, 1906	19 years, 142 days	Naud Junction Pavilion, Los Angeles, California, U.S.	For world featherweight title
48	Win	32–5–11	Willie Moody	NWS	6	Apr 9, 1906	18 years, 265 days	Washington S.C., Philadelphia, Pennsylvania, U.S.	
47	Loss	31–5–11	Abe Attell	PTS	15	Feb 22, 1906	18 years, 219 days	Lincoln A.C., Chelsea, Massachusetts, U.S.	For world featherweight title
46	Win	31–4–11	Jack Langdon	NWS	6	Feb 19, 1906	18 years, 216 days	Washington S.C., Philadelphia, Pennsylvania, U.S.	
45	Win	30–4–11	Johnny Reagan	KO	5 (15)	Feb 12, 1906	18 years, 209 days	Pythian Rink, Chelsea, Massachusetts, U.S.	
44	Win	29–4–11	Tommy O'Toole	NWS	6	Jan 27, 1906	18 years, 193 days	National A.C., Philadelphia, Pennsylvania, U.S.	
43	Win	28–4–11	Digger Stanley	PTS	15	Oct 20, 1905	18 years, 94 days	Pythian Rink, Chelsea, Massachusetts, U.S.	Retained world bantamweight title claim
42	Draw	27–4–11	Tommy O'Toole	NWS	6	Sep 23, 1905	18 years, 67 days	National A.C., Philadelphia, Pennsylvania, U.S.	
41	Loss	27–4–10	Tommy O'Toole	NWS	6	Sep 4, 1905	18 years, 48 days	National A.C., Philadelphia, Pennsylvania, U.S.	
40	Win	27–3–10	Willie Gibbs	PTS	15	May 23, 1905	17 years, 309 days	Douglas A.C., Chelsea, Massachusetts, U.S.	
39	Win	26–3–10	Phil Logan	NWS	6	May 1, 1905	17 years, 287 days	Washington S.C., Philadelphia, Pennsylvania, U.S.	
38	Win	25–3–10	Danny Dougherty	NWS	6	Mar 31, 1905	17 years, 256 days	Knickerbocker A.C., Philadelphia, Pennsylvania, U.S.	
37	Loss	24–3–10	Monte Attell	DQ	6 (6)	Mar 29, 1905	17 years, 254 days	National A.C., Philadelphia, Pennsylvania, U.S.	Claimed world bantamweight title; Walsh claims title after leading until DQ'd for a low blow
36	Win	24–2–10	Joe Wagner	TKO	2 (6)	Mar 25, 1905	17 years, 250 days	National A.C., Philadelphia, Pennsylvania, U.S.	
35	Win	23–2–10	Monte Attell	NWS	6	Mar 20, 1905	17 years, 245 days	Washington S.C., Philadelphia, Pennsylvania, U.S.	
34	Win	22–2–10	Tommy Feltz	DQ	11 (15)	Mar 7, 1905	17 years, 232 days	Douglas A.C., Chelsea, Massachusetts, U.S.	
33	Win	21–2–10	Harry Brodigan	KO	1 (10), 2:30	Dec 26, 1904	17 years, 161 days	North Street Rink, Salem, Massachusetts, U.S.	
32	Win	20–2–10	Bob Kendrick	NWS	6	Oct 8, 1904	17 years, 82 days	National A.C., Philadelphia, Pennsylvania, U.S.	
31	Draw	19–2–10	Danny Dougherty	NWS	6	Sep 17, 1904	17 years, 61 days	National A.C., Philadelphia, Pennsylvania, U.S.	
30	Draw	19–2–9	Digger Stanley	PTS	15	Jun 6, 1904	16 years, 324 days	National Sporting Club, Covent Garden, London, England	Billed 112lbs world title
29	Loss	19–2–8	Digger Stanley	PTS	15	Apr 18, 1904	16 years, 275 days	National Sporting Club, Covent Garden, London, England	Billed 8st world title
28	Draw	19–1–8	Jack Desmond	PTS	12	Mar 2, 1904	16 years, 228 days	Riverview A.C., Dracut, Massachusetts, U.S.	
27	Win	19–1–7	Tommy Quigley	KO	13 (?)	Feb 23, 1904	16 years, 220 days	Central A.C., Boston, Massachusetts, U.S.	
26	Win	18–1–7	Jim Connolly	TKO	1 (?)	Feb 20, 1904	16 years, 217 days	Central A.C., Boston, Massachusetts, U.S.	
25	Win	17–1–7	Kid Williams	TKO	2 (12)	Feb 6, 1904	16 years, 203 days	Central A.C., Boston, Massachusetts, U.S.	
24	Win	16–1–7	Kid Paul	KO	5 (?)	Jan 9, 1904	16 years, 175 days	Central A.C., Boston, Massachusetts, U.S.	
23	Win	15–1–7	Harry Brown	TKO	9 (?)	Nov 21, 1903	16 years, 126 days	Central A.C., Boston, Massachusetts, U.S.	
22	Win	14–1–7	Young Hines	KO	2 (?)	Nov 9, 1903	16 years, 114 days	Allston A.C., Boston, Massachusetts, U.S.	
21	Win	13–1–7	Eddie Carr	TKO	10 (?)	Oct 2, 1903	16 years, 76 days	Lenox A.C., Boston, Massachusetts, U.S.	
20	Win	12–1–7	Al Delmont	PTS	12	Sep 11, 1903	16 years, 55 days	Lenox A.C., Boston, Massachusetts, U.S.	
19	Win	11–1–7	Terry Edwards	PTS	12	May 6, 1903	15 years, 292 days	Essex A.C., Boston, Massachusetts, U.S.	
18	Win	10–1–7	Terry Edwards	PTS	10	Apr 24, 1903	15 years, 280 days	Lenox A.C., Boston, Massachusetts, U.S.	
17	Win	9–1–7	Johnny Powers	PTS	10	Apr 17, 1903	15 years, 273 days	Lenox A.C., Boston, Massachusetts, U.S.	
16	Win	8–1–7	Willie Schumacher	PTS	10	Mar 26, 1903	15 years, 251 days	Essex A.C., Boston, Massachusetts, U.S.	Billed American bantamweight title
15	Win	7–1–7	Johnny Powers	PTS	10	Mar 17, 1903	15 years, 242 days	Tammany A.C., Roxbury, Massachusetts, U.S.	
14	Win	6–1–7	Johnny Kid Sheehan	PTS	8	Feb 20, 1903	15 years, 217 days	Lenox A.C., Boston, Massachusetts, U.S.	Claimed bantamweight championship of the East
13	Win	5–1–7	Young Brooks	PTS	6	Jan 28, 1903	15 years, 194 days	Lenox A.C., Boston, Massachusetts, U.S.	
12	Win	4–1–7	Kid Terrell	KO	? (6)	Jan 23, 1903	15 years, 189 days	Essex A.C., Boston, Massachusetts, U.S.	
11	Win	3–1–7	Patsy McKenna	PTS	6	Dec 30, 1902	15 years, 165 days	Essex A.C., Boston, Massachusetts, U.S.	
10	Win	2–1–7	Denny Ryan	KO	2 (?)	Dec 25, 1902	15 years, 160 days	Lenox A.C., Boston, Massachusetts, U.S.	
9	Draw	1–1–7	Patsy McKenna	PTS	6	Dec 19, 1902	15 years, 154 days	Hoffman A.C., Salem, Massachusetts, U.S.	
8	Draw	1–1–6	Patsy McKenna	PTS	6	Nov 7, 1902	15 years, 112 days	Lenox A.C., Boston, Massachusetts, U.S.	
7	Draw	1–1–5	Al Delmont	PTS	6	Oct 17, 1902	15 years, 91 days	Boston, Massachusetts, U.S.	
6	Draw	1–1–4	Johnny Lynch	PTS	6	Oct 13, 1902	15 years, 87 days	Cambridge A.A., Cambridge, Massachusetts, U.S.	
5	Draw	1–1–3	Al Delmont	PTS	6	Oct 7, 1902	15 years, 81 days	Lenox A.C., Boston, Massachusetts, U.S.	
4	Draw	1–1–2	Jimmy Malloy	PTS	6	Aug 20, 1902	15 years, 33 days	Wilkens A.C., Providence, Rhode Island, U.S.	
3	Loss	1–1–1	Al Delmont	PTS	10	Aug 1, 1902	15 years, 14 days	King Philip Club, Providence, Rhode Island, U.S.	
2	Draw	1–0–1	Al Delmont	PTS	6	Jun 25, 1902	14 years, 342 days	East Boston A.A., Boston, Massachusetts, U.S.	
1	Win	1–0	Al Delmont	PTS	6	Apr 19, 1902	14 years, 275 days	Lenox A.C., Boston, Massachusetts, U.S.	

== See also ==
- List of bantamweight boxing champions

Achievements
Vacant Title next held by Joe Bowker	World Bantamweight Champion; March 29, 1905 – January 29, 1909	Succeeded by Jimmy Reagan
