= Frankie Fleming =

Canadian boxer

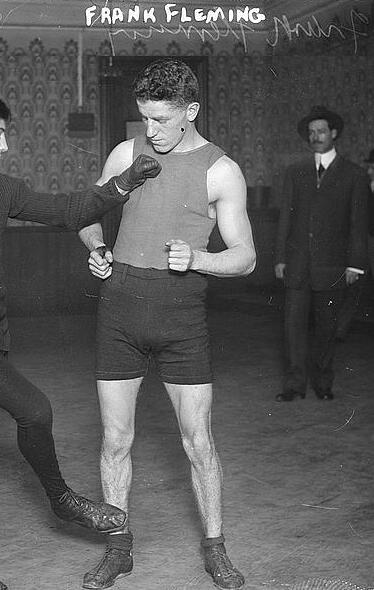

Personal information
- Born: January 1, 1893 Toronto, Ontario, Canada
- Died: January 1, 1960 (aged 67) Montreal, Quebec, Canada
- Height: 5 ft 6 in (1.68 m)
- Weight: Featherweight

Boxing career
- Stance: Orthodox

Boxing record
- Total fights: 118
- Wins: 92
- Win by KO: 37
- Losses: 13
- Draws: 12
- No contests: 1

Frank "Frankie" Fleming (1893-1960) was a Canadian featherweight boxer active from 1910 to 1922. During his career he held the distinction of being the Canadian Boxing Federation Featherweight Champion. He is best known for beating all-time great Benny Leonard twice, being the only fighter to do so. He also faced Hall of Famers Johnny Kilbane, Johnny Dundee, and Freddie Welsh in defeat; challenging for the latter's World Featherweight Title. Statistical boxing website BoxRec rates Fleming as the 11th best Canadian boxer ever across all weight divisions.

== Professional boxing record ==
All information in this section is derived from BoxRec, unless otherwise stated.

=== Official record ===
118 fights	64 wins	6 losses
By knockout	37	3
By decision	26	1
By disqualification	1	2
Draws	5	
No contests	1	
Newspaper decisions/draws	42	

All newspaper decisions are officially regarded as “no decision” bouts and are not counted in the win/loss/draw column.

No.	Result	Record	Opponent	Type	Round, time	Date	Age	Location	Notes
118	Win	64–6–5 (43)	Sailor Butler	PTS	10	May 10, 1924	31 years, 130 days	Windsor, Ontario, Canada	
117	Win	63–6–5 (43)	Oscar Deschamps	PTS	10	May 31, 1922	29 years, 150 days	Mount Royal Arena, Montreal, Quebec, Canada	
116	Draw	62–6–5 (43)	Oscar Deschamps	PTS	10	Apr 27, 1922	29 years, 116 days	Mount Royal Arena, Montreal, Quebec, Canada	For vacant Canadian lightweight title
115	Win	62–6–4 (43)	Freddie Jacks	PTS	10	May 27, 1921	28 years, 146 days	Maple Leaf Gardens, Toronto, Canada	Retained Canadian featherweight title
114	Win	61–6–4 (43)	Bearcat Fulton	TKO	4 (10)	Apr 11, 1921	28 years, 100 days	The Armouries, Toronto, Ontario, Canada	
113	Win	60–6–4 (43)	Georges Papin	PTS	10	Jul 1, 1920	27 years, 182 days	Mount Royal Arena, Montreal, Quebec, Canada	
112	Win	59–6–4 (43)	Georges Papin	PTS	10	Jun 3, 1920	27 years, 154 days	Mount Royal Arena, Montreal, Quebec, Canada	
111	Win	58–6–4 (43)	Larry Connolly	KO	3 (10)	Apr 29, 1920	27 years, 119 days	Mount Royal Arena, Montreal, Quebec, Canada	
110	Win	57–6–4 (43)	Terry Martin	KO	3 (10)	Mar 26, 1920	27 years, 85 days	Massey Hall, Toronto, Ontario, Canada	
109	Win	56–6–4 (43)	Dick Atkins	PTS	10	Mar 15, 1920	27 years, 74 days	Massey Hall, Toronto, Ontario, Canada	
108	Win	55–6–4 (43)	Jimmy Sacco	NWS	6	Jan 26, 1920	27 years, 25 days	Olympia A.C., Philadelphia, Pennsylvania, US	
107	Win	55–6–4 (42)	Irish Kennedy	TKO	6 (10)	Jan 12, 1920	27 years, 11 days	Massey Hall, Toronto, Ontario, Canada	
106	Win	54–6–4 (42)	Herman Smith	PTS	10	Dec 3, 1919	26 years, 336 days	Theatre francais, Montreal, Quebec, Canada	
105	Win	53–6–4 (42)	Nick Michaels	PTS	10	Nov 19, 1919	26 years, 322 days	Theatre francais, Montreal, Quebec, Canada	
104	Draw	52–6–4 (42)	Herman Smith	NWS	10	Oct 30, 1919	26 years, 302 days	Broadway Auditorium, Buffalo, New York, US	
103	Win	52–6–4 (41)	Dick Loadman	NWS	10	Oct 22, 1919	26 years, 294 days	Theatre francais, Montreal, Quebec, Canada	
102	Loss	52–6–4 (40)	Tony Dennis	KO	3 (10)	Sep 1, 1919	26 years, 243 days	Moline, Illinois, US	
101	Win	52–5–4 (40)	Gussie Lewis	PTS	10	Mar 31, 1919	26 years, 89 days	Theatre francais, Montreal, Quebec, Canada	
100	Win	51–5–4 (40)	Eddie Wallace	NWS	10	Feb 12, 1919	26 years, 42 days	Sohmer Park, Montreal, Quebec, Canada	
99	Win	51–5–4 (39)	Walter Brooks	TKO	6 (10)	Jan 29, 1919	26 years, 28 days	Sohmer Park, Montreal, Quebec, Canada	
98	Loss	50–5–4 (39)	Eddie Wallace	PTS	10	Dec 18, 1918	25 years, 351 days	Sohmer Park, Montreal, Quebec, Canada	
97	Win	50–4–4 (39)	Joe Burns	PTS	10	Dec 4, 1918	25 years, 337 days	Sohmer Park, Montreal, Quebec, Canada	
96	Win	49–4–4 (39)	Billy McKenzie	PTS	4	Apr 24, 1918	25 years, 113 days	Kingston, Ontario, Canada	
95	Win	48–4–4 (39)	Jake Schiffer	PTS	10	Apr 15, 1918	25 years, 104 days	Massey Hall, Toronto, Ontario, Canada	
94	Win	47–4–4 (39)	Joe Burns	PTS	10	Jan 30, 1918	25 years, 29 days	Sohmer Park, Montreal, Quebec, Canada	Won vacant Canadian featherweight title
93	Win	46–4–4 (39)	Red Allen	PTS	10	Jun 22, 1917	24 years, 172 days	Quebec City, Quebec, Canada	
92	Win	45–4–4 (39)	Eddie Wallace	PTS	10	Jun 13, 1917	24 years, 163 days	Gayety Theatre, Montreal, Quebec, Canada	
91	Loss	44–4–4 (39)	Johnny Kilbane	NWS	10	May 24, 1917	24 years, 143 days	Sohmer Park, Montreal, Quebec, Canada	
90	Win	44–4–4 (38)	Harry Condon	NWS	10	Apr 11, 1917	24 years, 100 days	Sohmer Park, Montreal, Quebec, Canada	
89	Win	44–4–4 (37)	Harry Condon	DQ	3 (10)	Mar 20, 1917	24 years, 78 days	Sohmer Park, Montreal, Quebec, Canada	
88	Win	43–4–4 (37)	Ray Rivers	TKO	9 (10)	Feb 9, 1917	24 years, 39 days	Sohmer Park, Montreal, Quebec, Canada	
87	Win	42–4–4 (37)	Eddie Wallace	NWS	10	Jun 21, 1916	23 years, 172 days	Gayety Theatre, Montreal, Quebec, Canada	
86	ND	42–4–4 (36)	Eddie Wallace	ND	2 (10)	Apr 27, 1916	23 years, 117 days	163rd Regiment Drill Hall, Montreal, Quebec, Canada	Referee ruled a no decision after Fleming was hit with an accidental low blow and refused to continue
85	Win	42–4–4 (35)	Leo Vincent	NWS	6	Apr 15, 1916	23 years, 105 days	National A.C., Philadelphia, Pennsylvania, US	
84	Win	42–4–4 (34)	Phinney Boyle	KO	9 (12)	Apr 10, 1916	23 years, 100 days	Coliseum, Woonsocket, Rhode Island, US	
83	Win	41–4–4 (34)	Young Rector	NWS	10	Apr 3, 1916	23 years, 93 days	Manhattan Opera House, New York City, New York, US	
82	Draw	41–4–4 (33)	George Kirkwood	NWS	10	Mar 30, 1916	23 years, 89 days	Manhattan Opera House, New York City, New York, US	
81	Win	41–4–4 (32)	Johnny Eggers	NWS	10	Mar 18, 1916	23 years, 77 days	Canadian A.C., Montreal, Quebec, Canada	
80	Win	41–4–4 (31)	Joe Mooney	NWS	10	Mar 11, 1916	23 years, 70 days	Fairmont A.C., New York City, New York, US	
79	Win	41–4–4 (30)	Frankie White	NWS	6	Mar 4, 1916	23 years, 63 days	National A.C., Philadelphia, Pennsylvania, US	
78	Win	41–4–4 (29)	Jack O'Keefe	NWS	6	Jan 21, 1916	23 years, 20 days	Riverdale Rink, Toronto, Ontario, Canada	
77	Win	41–4–4 (28)	Young Frankie Callahan	KO	7 (10)	Jun 24, 1915	22 years, 174 days	Jubilee Rink, Montreal, Quebec, Canada	
76	Loss	40–4–4 (28)	Freddie Welsh	NWS	10	May 24, 1915	22 years, 143 days	Sohmer Park, Montreal, Quebec, Canada	World lightweight title at stake; (via KO only)
75	Win	40–4–4 (27)	Kid Julian	PTS	10	May 17, 1915	22 years, 136 days	Sohmer Park, Montreal, Quebec, Canada	
74	Win	39–4–4 (27)	Frankie Mango	KO	5 (10)	Apr 12, 1915	22 years, 101 days	Shawinigan, Quebec, Canada	Exact date needs verified
73	Win	38–4–4 (27)	Harry Bingham	RTD	5 (10)	Mar 25, 1915	22 years, 83 days	Montreal Sporting Club, Montreal, Quebec, Canada	
72	Win	37–4–4 (27)	Amos Russell	PTS	10	Mar 5, 1915	22 years, 63 days	Canadian A.C., Montreal, Quebec, Canada	
71	Win	36–4–4 (27)	Amos Russell	KO	4 (10)	Feb 5, 1915	22 years, 35 days	Riviere-du-Loup, Canada	
70	Win	35–4–4 (27)	Willie Warren	PTS	10	Jan 30, 1915	22 years, 29 days	Canadian A.C., Montreal, Quebec, Canada	
69	Win	34–4–4 (27)	Tommy Houck	PTS	10	Jan 8, 1915	22 years, 7 days	Canadian A.C., Montreal, Quebec, Canada	Retained Canada featherweight title
68	Win	33–4–4 (27)	Jack Goodney	TKO	5 (10), 1:00	Dec 21, 1914	21 years, 354 days	Canadian A.C., Montreal, Quebec, Canada	
67	Win	32–4–4 (27)	Alf Freeman	KO	2 (10)	Dec 11, 1914	21 years, 344 days	Canadian A.C., Montreal, Quebec, Canada	
66	Loss	31–4–4 (27)	Eddie Wallace	NWS	10	Nov 26, 1914	21 years, 329 days	Broadway Arena, New York City, New York, US	
65	Win	31–4–4 (26)	Bushy Graham	NWS	10	Nov 21, 1914	21 years, 324 days	Fairmont A.C., New York City, New York, US	
64	Win	31–4–4 (25)	Tommy Houck	NWS	10	Oct 10, 1914	21 years, 282 days	Fairmont A.C., Manhattan, New York City, New York, US	
63	Win	31–4–4 (24)	Young McAuliffe	NWS	10	Mar 30, 1914	21 years, 88 days	Casino Hall, Bridgeport, Connecticut, US	
62	Win	31–4–4 (23)	Willie Warren	NWS	10	Mar 21, 1914	21 years, 79 days	Fairmont A.C., New York City, New York, US	
61	Win	31–4–4 (22)	George Bland	KO	2 (10)	Mar 14, 1914	21 years, 72 days	Readoscope Theater, Montreal, Quebec, Canada	
60	Win	30–4–4 (22)	Hugh Rodden	NWS	10	Feb 7, 1914	21 years, 37 days	Fairmont A.C., New York City, New York, US	
59	Win	30–4–4 (21)	Teddy Hubbs	TKO	4 (10)	Jan 27, 1914	21 years, 26 days	Roodner's Hall, Norwalk, Connecticut, US	
58	Win	29–4–4 (21)	Young Joseph	KO	3 (12)	Jan 24, 1914	21 years, 23 days	Montreal, Quebec, Canada	Won vacant Canada featherweight title
57	Win	28–4–4 (21)	Tommy Houck	NWS	10	Jan 3, 1914	21 years, 2 days	Fairmont A.C., New York City, New York, US	
56	Win	28–4–4 (20)	Patsy White	TKO	1 (10)	Dec 13, 1913	20 years, 346 days	Fairmont A.C., New York City, New York, US	Second fight in one day
55	Win	27–4–4 (20)	Johnny Victor	KO	3 (10)	Dec 13, 1913	20 years, 346 days	Fairmont A.C., New York City, New York, US	
54	Win	26–4–4 (20)	George 'Young' Collins	KO	2 (10)	Nov 28, 1913	20 years, 331 days	Canadian A.C., Montreal, Quebec, Canada	
53	Win	25–4–4 (20)	Young Delphine	KO	1 (10)	Nov 21, 1913	20 years, 324 days	Canadian A.C., Montreal, Quebec, Canada	
52	Win	24–4–4 (20)	Walter Brooks	NWS	10	Sep 20, 1913	20 years, 262 days	Fairmont A.C., New York City, New York, US	
51	Win	24–4–4 (19)	Benny Leonard	NWS	10	Aug 16, 1913	20 years, 227 days	Fairmont A.C., New York City, New York, US	
50	Draw	24–4–4 (18)	Joe Goldberg	NWS	10	Jul 2, 1913	20 years, 182 days	St. Nicholas Arena, New York City, New York, US	
49	Win	24–4–4 (17)	Phil Bloom	NWS	10	Apr 26, 1913	20 years, 115 days	Atlantic Garden A.C., New York City, New York, US	
48	Win	24–4–4 (16)	Teddy Hubbs	KO	9 (10)	Apr 19, 1913	20 years, 108 days	Fairmont A.C., New York City, New York, US	
47	Win	23–4–4 (16)	Johnny Eggers	NWS	10	Apr 11, 1913	20 years, 100 days	New Polo A.C., New York City, New York, US	
46	Win	23–4–4 (15)	Jack O'Donnell	TKO	3 (10)	Mar 27, 1913	20 years, 85 days	New Amsterdam Opera House, New York City, New York, US	
45	Win	22–4–4 (15)	Frankie O'Neill	KO	1 (10)	Mar 7, 1913	20 years, 65 days	New Polo A.C., New York City, New York, US	
44	Win	21–4–4 (15)	Frankie Mango	KO	5 (10)	Feb 17, 1913	20 years, 47 days	Eagles Hall, Bridgeport, Connecticut, US	
43	Win	20–4–4 (15)	Willie Chandler	NWS	10	Jan 3, 1913	20 years, 2 days	New Polo A.C., New York City, New York, US	
42	Win	20–4–4 (14)	Kid Black	TKO	10 (10)	Dec 27, 1912	19 years, 361 days	Madison Square Garden, New York City, New York, US	
41	Win	19–4–4 (14)	Freddie O'Brien	TKO	8 (10)	Nov 9, 1912	19 years, 313 days	Fairmont A.C., New York City, New York, US	
40	Loss	18–4–4 (14)	George Kirkwood	KO	1 (10)	Sep 9, 1912	19 years, 252 days	Madison Square Garden, New York City, New York, US	
39	Loss	18–3–4 (14)	Tommy O'Toole	NWS	6	Sep 7, 1912	19 years, 250 days	National A.C., Philadelphia, Pennsylvania, US	
38	Win	18–3–4 (13)	Milton Bleier	KO	3 (10)	Aug 3, 1912	19 years, 215 days	Fairmont A.C., New York City, New York, US	
37	Win	17–3–4 (13)	Tommy Buck	TKO	10 (10)	Jul 22, 1912	19 years, 203 days	Madison Square Garden, New York City, New York, US	
36	Win	16–3–4 (13)	Biz Mackey	KO	1 (10)	Jun 15, 1912	19 years, 166 days	Fairmont A.C., New York City, New York, US	
35	Win	15–3–4 (13)	Benny Leonard	KO	4 (6)	May 3, 1912	19 years, 123 days	New Polo A.C., New York City, New York, US	
34	Win	14–3–4 (13)	Kid Black	NWS	10	Apr 20, 1912	19 years, 110 days	Fairmont A.C., New York City, New York, US	
33	Win	14–3–4 (12)	Young Elliott	PTS	10	Jan 16, 1912	19 years, 15 days	Riverdale Athletic Club, Oshawa, Ontario, Canada	
32	Win	13–3–4 (12)	Tommy Butler	KO	6 (6)	Dec 21, 1911	18 years, 354 days	Olympic B.C., Toronto, Ontario, Canada	
31	Win	12–3–4 (12)	Billy Turley	PTS	8	Dec 7, 1911	18 years, 340 days	Agnes Street Theatre, Toronto, Ontario, Canada	
30	Win	11–3–4 (12)	Jack Dexter	PTS	6	Oct 25, 1911	18 years, 297 days	Olympic B.C., Toronto, Ontario, Canada	
29	Win	10–3–4 (12)	Jack McCracken	KO	6 (10)	Oct 5, 1911	18 years, 277 days	Olympic B.C., Toronto, Ontario, Canada	
28	Win	9–3–4 (12)	Joe Shear	PTS	6	Sep 4, 1911	18 years, 246 days	Island Stadium, Toronto, Ontario, Canada	
27	Win	8–3–4 (12)	Fred Lansdowne	KO	3 (6)	Jul 25, 1911	18 years, 205 days	Island Stadium, Toronto, Ontario, Canada	
26	Draw	7–3–4 (12)	Joe Shear	NWS	10	Jul 15, 1911	18 years, 195 days	Fairmont A.C., New York City, New York, US	
25	Loss	7–3–4 (11)	Johnny Dundee	NWS	10	Jun 10, 1911	18 years, 160 days	Fairmont A.C., New York City, New York, US	
24	Win	7–3–4 (10)	Kid Black	NWS	10	Jun 3, 1911	18 years, 153 days	Fairmont A.C., New York City, New York, US	
23	Win	7–3–4 (9)	Young Mickey McDonough	KO	2 (10)	May 27, 1911	18 years, 146 days	Fairmont A.C., New York City, New York, US	
22	Draw	6–3–4 (9)	Joe Blum	NWS	6	Apr 26, 1911	18 years, 115 days	Manhattan Casino, New York City, New York, US	
21	Draw	6–3–4 (8)	Darkey Griffin	NWS	6	Apr 11, 1911	18 years, 100 days	German Hall, Albany, New York, US	
20	Win	6–3–4 (7)	Jack McCormick	KO	3 (10)	Apr 7, 1911	18 years, 96 days	New Polo A.C., New York City, New York, US	
19	Win	5–3–4 (7)	Eddie Sherman	NWS	6	Mar 20, 1911	18 years, 78 days	Olympic A.C., New York City, New York, US	
18	Loss	5–3–4 (6)	Johnny Dundee	NWS	6	Mar 1, 1911	18 years, 59 days	Olympic A.C., New York City, New York, US	
17	Win	5–3–4 (5)	Bud White	KO	5 (10)	Feb 22, 1911	18 years, 52 days	Manhattan Casino, New York City, New York, US	
16	Win	4–3–4 (5)	Tiger Young	NWS	10	Feb 10, 1911	18 years, 40 days	New Polo A.C., New York City, New York, US	
15	Loss	4–3–4 (4)	Young Hess	DQ	3 (6)	Jan 20, 1911	18 years, 19 days	Hudson River Casino, New York City, New York, US	
14	Draw	4–2–4 (4)	Lew Tracey	NWS	6	Jan 9, 1911	18 years, 8 days	Olympic A.C., New York City, New York, US	
13	Win	4–2–4 (3)	Harry Phillips	NWS	4	Dec 23, 1910	17 years, 356 days	New Amsterdam Opera House, New York City, New York, US	
12	Loss	4–2–4 (2)	Louisiana	NWS	10	Nov 10, 1910	17 years, 313 days	Owl A.C., Scranton, Pennsylvania, US	
11	Win	4–2–4 (1)	Johnny Eggers	NWS	6	Oct 12, 1910	17 years, 284 days	Sharkey A.C., New York City, New York, US	
10	Loss	4–2–4	George Betts	DQ	8 (10)	Nov 9, 1909	16 years, 312 days	Albany, New York, US	
9	Win	4–1–4	Kid Hubert	KO	9 (10)	Apr 30, 1909	16 years, 119 days	Montreal, Quebec, Canada	
8	Win	3–1–4	Dick Thomas	PTS	10	Apr 2, 1909	16 years, 91 days	Montreal, Quebec, Canada	
7	Draw	2–1–4	Young Dussault	PTS	6	May 14, 1908	15 years, 134 days	Montreal, Quebec, Canada	
6	Draw	2–1–3	Kid Locke	PTS	6	Apr 23, 1908	15 years, 113 days	Montreal, Quebec, Canada	
5	Draw	2–1–2	Young Herman	PTS	6	Apr 9, 1908	15 years, 99 days	Montreal, Quebec, Canada	
4	Win	2–1–1	Kid Locke	PTS	6	Nov 19, 1907	14 years, 322 days	Montreal, Quebec, Canada	
3	Draw	1–1–1	Bobby Critcher	PTS	6	Oct 28, 1907	14 years, 300 days	Montreal, Quebec, Canada	
2	Win	1–1	Kid Locke	PTS	6	Apr 24, 1907	14 years, 113 days	Montreal, Quebec, Canada	
1	Loss	0–1	Kid Locke	TKO	3 (6)	Feb 11, 1907	14 years, 41 days	Montreal, Quebec, Canada	

=== Unofficial record ===
118 fights	92 wins	13 losses
By knockout	37	3
By decision	54	8
By disqualification	1	2
Draws	12	
No contests	1	

Record with the inclusion of newspaper decisions in the win/loss/draw column.

No.	Result	Record	Opponent	Type	Round, time	Date	Age	Location	Notes
118	Win	92–13–12 (1)	Sailor Butler	PTS	10	May 10, 1924	31 years, 130 days	Windsor, Ontario, Canada	
117	Win	91–13–12 (1)	Oscar Deschamps	PTS	10	May 31, 1922	29 years, 150 days	Mount Royal Arena, Montreal, Quebec, Canada	
116	Draw	90–13–12 (1)	Oscar Deschamps	PTS	10	Apr 27, 1922	29 years, 116 days	Mount Royal Arena, Montreal, Quebec, Canada	For vacant Canadian lightweight title
115	Win	90–13–11 (1)	Freddie Jacks	PTS	10	May 27, 1921	28 years, 146 days	Maple Leaf Gardens, Toronto, Canada	Retained Canadian featherweight title
114	Win	89–13–11 (1)	Bearcat Fulton	TKO	4 (10)	Apr 11, 1921	28 years, 100 days	The Armouries, Toronto, Ontario, Canada	
113	Win	88–13–11 (1)	Georges Papin	PTS	10	Jul 1, 1920	27 years, 182 days	Mount Royal Arena, Montreal, Quebec, Canada	
112	Win	87–13–11 (1)	Georges Papin	PTS	10	Jun 3, 1920	27 years, 154 days	Mount Royal Arena, Montreal, Quebec, Canada	
111	Win	86–13–11 (1)	Larry Connolly	KO	3 (10)	Apr 29, 1920	27 years, 119 days	Mount Royal Arena, Montreal, Quebec, Canada	
110	Win	85–13–11 (1)	Terry Martin	KO	3 (10)	Mar 26, 1920	27 years, 85 days	Massey Hall, Toronto, Ontario, Canada	
109	Win	84–13–11 (1)	Dick Atkins	PTS	10	Mar 15, 1920	27 years, 74 days	Massey Hall, Toronto, Ontario, Canada	
108	Win	83–13–11 (1)	Jimmy Sacco	NWS	6	Jan 26, 1920	27 years, 25 days	Olympia A.C., Philadelphia, Pennsylvania, US	
107	Win	82–13–11 (1)	Irish Kennedy	TKO	6 (10)	Jan 12, 1920	27 years, 11 days	Massey Hall, Toronto, Ontario, Canada	
106	Win	81–13–11 (1)	Herman Smith	PTS	10	Dec 3, 1919	26 years, 336 days	Theatre francais, Montreal, Quebec, Canada	
105	Win	80–13–11 (1)	Nick Michaels	PTS	10	Nov 19, 1919	26 years, 322 days	Theatre francais, Montreal, Quebec, Canada	
104	Draw	79–13–11 (1)	Herman Smith	NWS	10	Oct 30, 1919	26 years, 302 days	Broadway Auditorium, Buffalo, New York, US	
103	Win	79–13–10 (1)	Dick Loadman	NWS	10	Oct 22, 1919	26 years, 294 days	Theatre francais, Montreal, Quebec, Canada	
102	Loss	78–13–10 (1)	Tony Dennis	KO	3 (10)	Sep 1, 1919	26 years, 243 days	Moline, Illinois, US	
101	Win	78–12–10 (1)	Gussie Lewis	PTS	10	Mar 31, 1919	26 years, 89 days	Theatre francais, Montreal, Quebec, Canada	
100	Win	77–12–10 (1)	Eddie Wallace	NWS	10	Feb 12, 1919	26 years, 42 days	Sohmer Park, Montreal, Quebec, Canada	
99	Win	76–12–10 (1)	Walter Brooks	TKO	6 (10)	Jan 29, 1919	26 years, 28 days	Sohmer Park, Montreal, Quebec, Canada	
98	Loss	75–12–10 (1)	Eddie Wallace	PTS	10	Dec 18, 1918	25 years, 351 days	Sohmer Park, Montreal, Quebec, Canada	
97	Win	75–11–10 (1)	Joe Burns	PTS	10	Dec 4, 1918	25 years, 337 days	Sohmer Park, Montreal, Quebec, Canada	
96	Win	74–11–10 (1)	Billy McKenzie	PTS	4	Apr 24, 1918	25 years, 113 days	Kingston, Ontario, Canada	
95	Win	73–11–10 (1)	Jake Schiffer	PTS	10	Apr 15, 1918	25 years, 104 days	Massey Hall, Toronto, Ontario, Canada	
94	Win	72–11–10 (1)	Joe Burns	PTS	10	Jan 30, 1918	25 years, 29 days	Sohmer Park, Montreal, Quebec, Canada	Won vacant Canadian featherweight title
93	Win	71–11–10 (1)	Red Allen	PTS	10	Jun 22, 1917	24 years, 172 days	Quebec City, Quebec, Canada	
92	Win	70–11–10 (1)	Eddie Wallace	PTS	10	Jun 13, 1917	24 years, 163 days	Gayety Theatre, Montreal, Quebec, Canada	
91	Loss	69–11–10 (1)	Johnny Kilbane	NWS	10	May 24, 1917	24 years, 143 days	Sohmer Park, Montreal, Quebec, Canada	
90	Win	69–10–10 (1)	Harry Condon	NWS	10	Apr 11, 1917	24 years, 100 days	Sohmer Park, Montreal, Quebec, Canada	
89	Win	68–10–10 (1)	Harry Condon	DQ	3 (10)	Mar 20, 1917	24 years, 78 days	Sohmer Park, Montreal, Quebec, Canada	
88	Win	67–10–10 (1)	Ray Rivers	TKO	9 (10)	Feb 9, 1917	24 years, 39 days	Sohmer Park, Montreal, Quebec, Canada	
87	Win	66–10–10 (1)	Eddie Wallace	NWS	10	Jun 21, 1916	23 years, 172 days	Gayety Theatre, Montreal, Quebec, Canada	
86	ND	65–10–10 (1)	Eddie Wallace	ND	2 (10)	Apr 27, 1916	23 years, 117 days	163rd Regiment Drill Hall, Montreal, Quebec, Canada	Referee ruled a no decision after Fleming was hit with an accidental low blow and refused to continue
85	Win	65–10–10	Leo Vincent	NWS	6	Apr 15, 1916	23 years, 105 days	National A.C., Philadelphia, Pennsylvania, US	
84	Win	64–10–10	Phinney Boyle	KO	9 (12)	Apr 10, 1916	23 years, 100 days	Coliseum, Woonsocket, Rhode Island, US	
83	Win	63–10–10	Young Rector	NWS	10	Apr 3, 1916	23 years, 93 days	Manhattan Opera House, New York City, New York, US	
82	Draw	62–10–10	George Kirkwood	NWS	10	Mar 30, 1916	23 years, 89 days	Manhattan Opera House, New York City, New York, US	
81	Win	62–10–9	Johnny Eggers	NWS	10	Mar 18, 1916	23 years, 77 days	Canadian A.C., Montreal, Quebec, Canada	
80	Win	61–10–9	Joe Mooney	NWS	10	Mar 11, 1916	23 years, 70 days	Fairmont A.C., New York City, New York, US	
79	Win	60–10–9	Frankie White	NWS	6	Mar 4, 1916	23 years, 63 days	National A.C., Philadelphia, Pennsylvania, US	
78	Win	59–10–9	Jack O'Keefe	NWS	6	Jan 21, 1916	23 years, 20 days	Riverdale Rink, Toronto, Ontario, Canada	
77	Win	58–10–9	Young Frankie Callahan	KO	7 (10)	Jun 24, 1915	22 years, 174 days	Jubilee Rink, Montreal, Quebec, Canada	
76	Loss	57–10–9	Freddie Welsh	NWS	10	May 24, 1915	22 years, 143 days	Sohmer Park, Montreal, Quebec, Canada	World lightweight title at stake; (via KO only)
75	Win	57–9–9	Kid Julian	PTS	10	May 17, 1915	22 years, 136 days	Sohmer Park, Montreal, Quebec, Canada	
74	Win	56–9–9	Frankie Mango	KO	5 (10)	Apr 12, 1915	22 years, 101 days	Shawinigan, Quebec, Canada	Exact date needs verified
73	Win	55–9–9	Harry Bingham	RTD	5 (10)	Mar 25, 1915	22 years, 83 days	Montreal Sporting Club, Montreal, Quebec, Canada	
72	Win	54–9–9	Amos Russell	PTS	10	Mar 5, 1915	22 years, 63 days	Canadian A.C., Montreal, Quebec, Canada	
71	Win	53–9–9	Amos Russell	KO	4 (10)	Feb 5, 1915	22 years, 35 days	Riviere-du-Loup, Canada	
70	Win	52–9–9	Willie Warren	PTS	10	Jan 30, 1915	22 years, 29 days	Canadian A.C., Montreal, Quebec, Canada	
69	Win	51–9–9	Tommy Houck	PTS	10	Jan 8, 1915	22 years, 7 days	Canadian A.C., Montreal, Quebec, Canada	Retained Canada featherweight title
68	Win	50–9–9	Jack Goodney	TKO	5 (10), 1:00	Dec 21, 1914	21 years, 354 days	Canadian A.C., Montreal, Quebec, Canada	
67	Win	49–9–9	Alf Freeman	KO	2 (10)	Dec 11, 1914	21 years, 344 days	Canadian A.C., Montreal, Quebec, Canada	
66	Loss	48–9–9	Eddie Wallace	NWS	10	Nov 26, 1914	21 years, 329 days	Broadway Arena, New York City, New York, US	
65	Win	48–8–9	Bushy Graham	NWS	10	Nov 21, 1914	21 years, 324 days	Fairmont A.C., New York City, New York, US	
64	Win	47–8–9	Tommy Houck	NWS	10	Oct 10, 1914	21 years, 282 days	Fairmont A.C., Manhattan, New York City, New York, US	
63	Win	46–8–9	Young McAuliffe	NWS	10	Mar 30, 1914	21 years, 88 days	Casino Hall, Bridgeport, Connecticut, US	
62	Win	45–8–9	Willie Warren	NWS	10	Mar 21, 1914	21 years, 79 days	Fairmont A.C., New York City, New York, US	
61	Win	44–8–9	George Bland	KO	2 (10)	Mar 14, 1914	21 years, 72 days	Readoscope Theater, Montreal, Quebec, Canada	
60	Win	43–8–9	Hugh Rodden	NWS	10	Feb 7, 1914	21 years, 37 days	Fairmont A.C., New York City, New York, US	
59	Win	42–8–9	Teddy Hubbs	TKO	4 (10)	Jan 27, 1914	21 years, 26 days	Roodner's Hall, Norwalk, Connecticut, US	
58	Win	41–8–9	Young Joseph	KO	3 (12)	Jan 24, 1914	21 years, 23 days	Montreal, Quebec, Canada	Won vacant Canada featherweight title
57	Win	40–8–9	Tommy Houck	NWS	10	Jan 3, 1914	21 years, 2 days	Fairmont A.C., New York City, New York, US	
56	Win	39–8–9	Patsy White	TKO	1 (10)	Dec 13, 1913	20 years, 346 days	Fairmont A.C., New York City, New York, US	Second fight in one day
55	Win	38–8–9	Johnny Victor	KO	3 (10)	Dec 13, 1913	20 years, 346 days	Fairmont A.C., New York City, New York, US	
54	Win	37–8–9	George 'Young' Collins	KO	2 (10)	Nov 28, 1913	20 years, 331 days	Canadian A.C., Montreal, Quebec, Canada	
53	Win	36–8–9	Young Delphine	KO	1 (10)	Nov 21, 1913	20 years, 324 days	Canadian A.C., Montreal, Quebec, Canada	
52	Win	35–8–9	Walter Brooks	NWS	10	Sep 20, 1913	20 years, 262 days	Fairmont A.C., New York City, New York, US	
51	Win	34–8–9	Benny Leonard	NWS	10	Aug 16, 1913	20 years, 227 days	Fairmont A.C., New York City, New York, US	
50	Draw	33–8–9	Joe Goldberg	NWS	10	Jul 2, 1913	20 years, 182 days	St. Nicholas Arena, New York City, New York, US	
49	Win	33–8–8	Phil Bloom	NWS	10	Apr 26, 1913	20 years, 115 days	Atlantic Garden A.C., New York City, New York, US	
48	Win	32–8–8	Teddy Hubbs	KO	9 (10)	Apr 19, 1913	20 years, 108 days	Fairmont A.C., New York City, New York, US	
47	Win	31–8–8	Johnny Eggers	NWS	10	Apr 11, 1913	20 years, 100 days	New Polo A.C., New York City, New York, US	
46	Win	30–8–8	Jack O'Donnell	TKO	3 (10)	Mar 27, 1913	20 years, 85 days	New Amsterdam Opera House, New York City, New York, US	
45	Win	29–8–8	Frankie O'Neill	KO	1 (10)	Mar 7, 1913	20 years, 65 days	New Polo A.C., New York City, New York, US	
44	Win	28–8–8	Frankie Mango	KO	5 (10)	Feb 17, 1913	20 years, 47 days	Eagles Hall, Bridgeport, Connecticut, US	
43	Win	27–8–8	Willie Chandler	NWS	10	Jan 3, 1913	20 years, 2 days	New Polo A.C., New York City, New York, US	
42	Win	26–8–8	Kid Black	TKO	10 (10)	Dec 27, 1912	19 years, 361 days	Madison Square Garden, New York City, New York, US	
41	Win	25–8–8	Freddie O'Brien	TKO	8 (10)	Nov 9, 1912	19 years, 313 days	Fairmont A.C., New York City, New York, US	
40	Loss	24–8–8	George Kirkwood	KO	1 (10)	Sep 9, 1912	19 years, 252 days	Madison Square Garden, New York City, New York, US	
39	Loss	24–7–8	Tommy O'Toole	NWS	6	Sep 7, 1912	19 years, 250 days	National A.C., Philadelphia, Pennsylvania, US	
38	Win	24–6–8	Milton Bleier	KO	3 (10)	Aug 3, 1912	19 years, 215 days	Fairmont A.C., New York City, New York, US	
37	Win	23–6–8	Tommy Buck	TKO	10 (10)	Jul 22, 1912	19 years, 203 days	Madison Square Garden, New York City, New York, US	
36	Win	22–6–8	Biz Mackey	KO	1 (10)	Jun 15, 1912	19 years, 166 days	Fairmont A.C., New York City, New York, US	
35	Win	21–6–8	Benny Leonard	KO	4 (6)	May 3, 1912	19 years, 123 days	New Polo A.C., New York City, New York, US	
34	Win	20–6–8	Kid Black	NWS	10	Apr 20, 1912	19 years, 110 days	Fairmont A.C., New York City, New York, US	
33	Win	19–6–8	Young Elliott	PTS	10	Jan 16, 1912	19 years, 15 days	Riverdale Athletic Club, Oshawa, Ontario, Canada	
32	Win	18–6–8	Tommy Butler	KO	6 (6)	Dec 21, 1911	18 years, 354 days	Olympic B.C., Toronto, Ontario, Canada	
31	Win	17–6–8	Billy Turley	PTS	8	Dec 7, 1911	18 years, 340 days	Agnes Street Theatre, Toronto, Ontario, Canada	
30	Win	16–6–8	Jack Dexter	PTS	6	Oct 25, 1911	18 years, 297 days	Olympic B.C., Toronto, Ontario, Canada	
29	Win	15–6–8	Jack McCracken	KO	6 (10)	Oct 5, 1911	18 years, 277 days	Olympic B.C., Toronto, Ontario, Canada	
28	Win	14–6–8	Joe Shear	PTS	6	Sep 4, 1911	18 years, 246 days	Island Stadium, Toronto, Ontario, Canada	
27	Win	13–6–8	Fred Lansdowne	KO	3 (6)	Jul 25, 1911	18 years, 205 days	Island Stadium, Toronto, Ontario, Canada	
26	Draw	12–6–8	Joe Shear	NWS	10	Jul 15, 1911	18 years, 195 days	Fairmont A.C., New York City, New York, US	
25	Loss	12–6–7	Johnny Dundee	NWS	10	Jun 10, 1911	18 years, 160 days	Fairmont A.C., New York City, New York, US	
24	Win	12–5–7	Kid Black	NWS	10	Jun 3, 1911	18 years, 153 days	Fairmont A.C., New York City, New York, US	
23	Win	11–5–7	Young Mickey McDonough	KO	2 (10)	May 27, 1911	18 years, 146 days	Fairmont A.C., New York City, New York, US	
22	Draw	10–5–7	Joe Blum	NWS	6	Apr 26, 1911	18 years, 115 days	Manhattan Casino, New York City, New York, US	
21	Draw	10–5–6	Darkey Griffin	NWS	6	Apr 11, 1911	18 years, 100 days	German Hall, Albany, New York, US	
20	Win	10–5–5	Jack McCormick	KO	3 (10)	Apr 7, 1911	18 years, 96 days	New Polo A.C., New York City, New York, US	
19	Win	9–5–5	Eddie Sherman	NWS	6	Mar 20, 1911	18 years, 78 days	Olympic A.C., New York City, New York, US	
18	Loss	8–5–5	Johnny Dundee	NWS	6	Mar 1, 1911	18 years, 59 days	Olympic A.C., New York City, New York, US	
17	Win	8–4–5	Bud White	KO	5 (10)	Feb 22, 1911	18 years, 52 days	Manhattan Casino, New York City, New York, US	
16	Win	7–4–5	Tiger Young	NWS	10	Feb 10, 1911	18 years, 40 days	New Polo A.C., New York City, New York, US	
15	Loss	6–4–5	Young Hess	DQ	3 (6)	Jan 20, 1911	18 years, 19 days	Hudson River Casino, New York City, New York, US	
14	Draw	6–3–5	Lew Tracey	NWS	6	Jan 9, 1911	18 years, 8 days	Olympic A.C., New York City, New York, US	
13	Win	6–3–4	Harry Phillips	NWS	4	Dec 23, 1910	17 years, 356 days	New Amsterdam Opera House, New York City, New York, US	
12	Loss	5–3–4	Louisiana	NWS	10	Nov 10, 1910	17 years, 313 days	Owl A.C., Scranton, Pennsylvania, US	
11	Win	5–2–4	Johnny Eggers	NWS	6	Oct 12, 1910	17 years, 284 days	Sharkey A.C., New York City, New York, US	
10	Loss	4–2–4	George Betts	DQ	8 (10)	Nov 9, 1909	16 years, 312 days	Albany, New York, US	
9	Win	4–1–4	Kid Hubert	KO	9 (10)	Apr 30, 1909	16 years, 119 days	Montreal, Quebec, Canada	
8	Win	3–1–4	Dick Thomas	PTS	10	Apr 2, 1909	16 years, 91 days	Montreal, Quebec, Canada	
7	Draw	2–1–4	Young Dussault	PTS	6	May 14, 1908	15 years, 134 days	Montreal, Quebec, Canada	
6	Draw	2–1–3	Kid Locke	PTS	6	Apr 23, 1908	15 years, 113 days	Montreal, Quebec, Canada	
5	Draw	2–1–2	Young Herman	PTS	6	Apr 9, 1908	15 years, 99 days	Montreal, Quebec, Canada	
4	Win	2–1–1	Kid Locke	PTS	6	Nov 19, 1907	14 years, 322 days	Montreal, Quebec, Canada	
3	Draw	1–1–1	Bobby Critcher	PTS	6	Oct 28, 1907	14 years, 300 days	Montreal, Quebec, Canada	
2	Win	1–1	Kid Locke	PTS	6	Apr 24, 1907	14 years, 113 days	Montreal, Quebec, Canada	
1	Loss	0–1	Kid Locke	TKO	3 (6)	Feb 11, 1907	14 years, 41 days	Montreal, Quebec, Canada	
