= Johnny Kilbane =

American boxer (1889–1957)

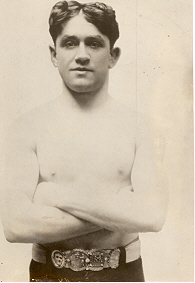

Personal information
- Nickname: Johnny
- Born: John Patrick Kilbane; April 9, 1889 Cleveland, Ohio, U.S.
- Died: May 31, 1957 (aged 68) Cleveland, Ohio, U.S.
- Weight: Featherweight

Boxing career

Boxing record
- Total fights: 143
- Wins: 110
- Win by KO: 24
- Losses: 17
- Draws: 15
- No contests: 1

John Patrick Kilbane (April 9, 1889 – May 31, 1957) was an American featherweight boxer in the early part of the 20th century. He held the World Featherweight title from 1912 to 1923, the longest period in the division's history, having defended the title against four contenders during the reign. Statistical boxing website BoxRec lists Kilbane as the No. 2 ranked featherweight of all-time, while The Ring Magazine founder Nat Fleischer placed him at No. 5. The International Boxing Research Organization rates Kilbane as the 8th best featherweight ever. He was inducted into the Ring Magazine Hall of Fame in 1960 and the International Boxing Hall of Fame in 1995.

== Early life ==
Kilbane was born to Irish emigrees John and Mary (Gallagher) Kilbane in Cleveland, Ohio on April 9, 1889. His mother died when he was 3 years old and his father went blind when he was 6. He attended school until the sixth grade when he dropped out to help support his family.

== Career ==
Kilbane's first professional fight was in 1907, for which he earned around $25.

=== World featherweight champion ===
On February 22, 1912, Kilbane took the featherweight title from Abe Atell in a twenty-round match in Vernon, California. When he returned to Cleveland, on St. Patrick's Day, he was given the greatest welcome ever given to a native Clevelander, with more than 100,000 people turning out. He held the featherweight championship for 11 years through numerous fights. He finally lost it to Eugene Criqui. The high number of "no decision"s in his career reflected early boxing rules in many states in the U.S. that dictated "no decision"—ND—unless a fight ended by knockout.

Kilbane fought 1904 World Bantamweight champion Jimmy Walsh in a World Featherweight Title match on May 21, 1912, at the Pilgrim Athletic Club in Boston, Massachusetts to a twelve-round draw decision. They had previously fought in a non-title match on May 30, 1911, in a 12-round draw bout in Canton, Ohio, that was characterized as "full of clinches", with neither man "doing much hard work."

Boxer Johnny Kilbane gives boxing instructions to U.S. Army troops, ca. 1917

In October 1917 - while still World Featherweight Champion - Kilbane became a lieutenant in the U.S. Army — assigned to Camp Sherman located near Chillicothe, Ohio — training U.S. soldiers in self-defense during World War I.

After losing the featherweight title in 1923, Kilbane won at least two exhibition bouts, and then retired from boxing.

== Life after boxing ==
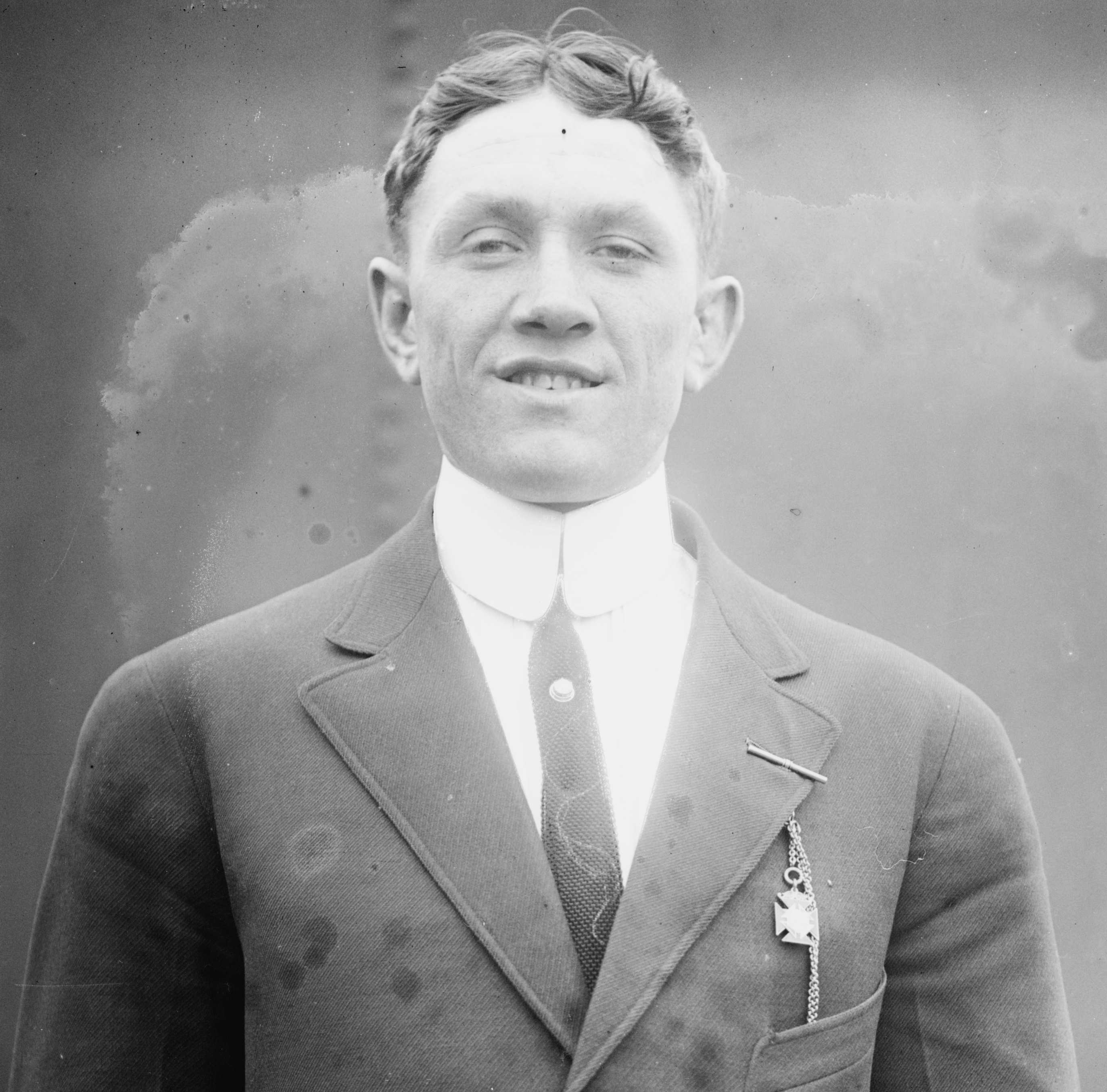
Kilbane in later life

Kilbane would referee boxing matches after retiring from boxing, as well as operating a gym, serving in the Ohio Senate and acting as Clerk of the Cleveland Municipal Court.

Kilbane was such a popular prizefighter in his day that his name appeared in print as a verb. An unsigned commentary in the sports pages of the New York Times on May 16, 1912, reported on an episode involving Detroit baseball player Ty Cobb, who the day before, in a game between the Detroit Tigers and the New York Yankees, had gone into the stands after a heckler. The commentary said, "The famous baseball player from Detroit, Ty Cobb chased after a heckler during a game with the New York Yankees and 'Johnny Kilbaned' him right where he stood...and in so doing stopped the profane and intolerable language dead in its tracks, along with the heckler himself". Kilbane was a distant relative of the Irish boxer John Joe Nevin, the footballer Darren Fletcher, the wrestler Giant Haystacks and the Irish footballer Kevin Kilbane. His family was originally from Achill, County Mayo, Ireland.

He died on May 31, 1957, in Cleveland, Ohio.

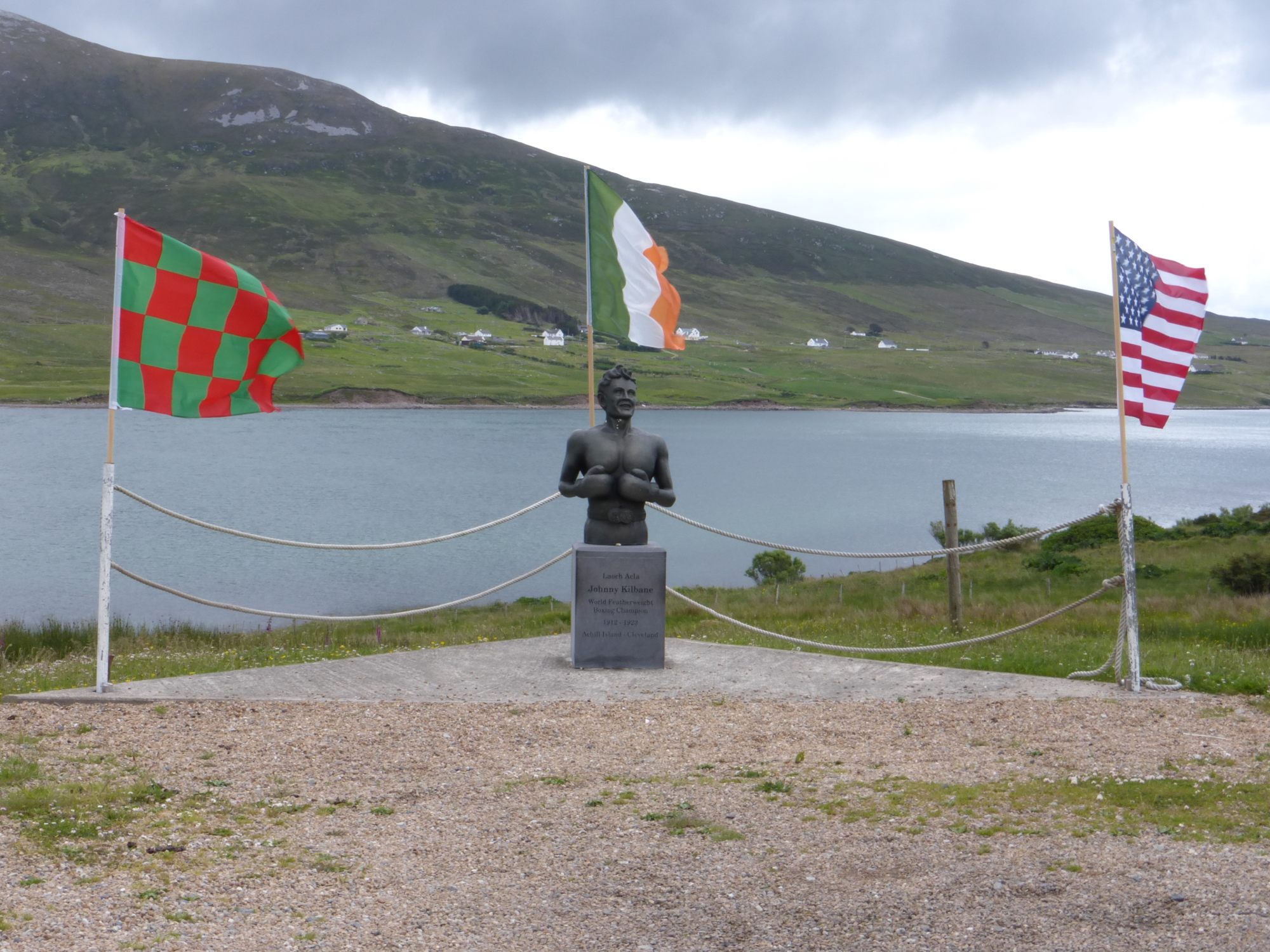
Statue of Johnny Kilbane on Achill Island

== Awards and honors ==
- 12-year reign as World Featherweight Champion
- 1995: International Boxing Hall of Fame inductee
- 2012: Street where Kilbane grew up in Cleveland (Herman Avenue) was renamed Kilbane Town
- 2012: Statue on Achill Island, County Mayo, Ireland from where his parents emigrated.
- 2014: Statue in Cleveland's Battery Park neighborhood.

== Professional boxing record ==
All information in this section is derived from BoxRec, unless otherwise stated.

=== Official record ===
143 fights	49 wins	6 losses
By knockout	24	3
By decision	25	3
Draws	7	
No contests	1	
Newspaper decisions/draws	80	

All newspaper decisions are officially regarded as “no decision” bouts and are not counted in the win/loss/draw column.

No.	Result	Record	Opponent	Type	Round	Date	Location	Notes
143	Loss	49–6–7 (81)	Eugène Criqui	TKO	6 (15)	Jun 2, 1923	Polo Grounds, New York City, New York, U.S.	Lost NYSAC featherweight title
142	Win	49–5–7 (81)	Danny Frush	KO	7 (12)	Sep 17, 1920	Dunn Field, Cleveland, Ohio, U.S.	Retained NYSAC featherweight title
141	Win	48–5–7 (81)	Freddie Jacks	NWS	10	May 25, 1920	Dunn Field, Cleveland, Ohio, U.S.	
140	Win	48–5–7 (80)	Artie Root	NWS	10	Jul 28, 1920	Cleveland, Ohio, U.S.	
139	Loss	48–5–7 (79)	Andy Chaney	NWS	8	Jun 2, 1920	Ice Palace, Philadelphia, Pennsylvania, U.S.	
138	Loss	48–5–7 (78)	Harry Brown	NWS	6	May 24, 1920	Shibe Park, Philadelphia, Pennsylvania, U.S.	
137	Win	48–5–7 (77)	Alvie Miller	KO	7 (10)	Apr 21, 1920	Opera House, Lorain, Ohio, U.S.	
136	Loss	47–5–7 (77)	Benny Valger	NWS	8	Feb 25, 1920	Newark Athletic Club, Newark, New Jersey, U.S.	
135	Win	47–5–7 (76)	Johnny Murray	NWS	6	Jan 24, 1920	National A.C., Philadelphia, Pennsylvania, U.S.	
134	Win	47–5–7 (75)	Al Shubert	NWS	6	Jan 1, 1920	Olympia A.C., Philadelphia, Pennsylvania, U.S.	
133	Loss	47–5–7 (74)	Andy Chaney	NWS	8	Dec 29, 1919	4th Regiment Armory, Jersey City, New Jersey, U.S.	
132	Win	47–5–7 (73)	Eddie Morgan	NWS	6	Sep 20, 1919	National A.C., Philadelphia, Pennsylvania, U.S.	
131	Win	47–5–7 (72)	Frankie Burns	TKO	5 (8)	Sep 16, 1919	International League Ballpark, Jersey City, New Jersey, U.S.	
130	Win	46–5–7 (72)	Joe Fox	NWS	6	Jul 28, 1919	Shibe Park, Philadelphia, Pennsylvania, U.S.	
129	Win	46–5–7 (71)	Ralph Brady	NWS	10	May 14, 1919	Grand Theater, Cleveland, Ohio, U.S.	
128	Win	46–5–7 (70)	Johnny Maloney	TKO	6 (6)	Apr 19, 1919	National A.C., Philadelphia, Pennsylvania, U.S.	
127	Win	45–5–7 (70)	Jack Lawler	NWS	10	Apr 12, 1919	Charleston, West Virginia, U.S.	
126	Win	45–5–7 (69)	Artie O'Leary	NWS	6	Apr 5, 1919	National A.C., Philadelphia, Pennsylvania, U.S.	
125	Win	45–5–7 (68)	Johnny Mealey	KO	2 (6)	Mar 31, 1919	Olympia A.C., Philadelphia, Pennsylvania, U.S.	
124	Loss	44–5–7 (68)	Frankie Brown	NWS	6	Mar 10, 1919	Olympia A.C., Philadelphia, Pennsylvania, U.S.	
123	Loss	44–5–7 (67)	Benny Leonard	TKO	3 (6)	Jul 25, 1917	Shibe Park, Philadelphia, Pennsylvania, U.S.	
122	Win	44–4–7 (67)	Frankie Fleming	NWS	10	May 24, 1917	Sohmer Park, Montreal, Quebec, Canada	
121	Win	44–4–7 (66)	Freddie Welsh	NWS	10	May 1, 1917	Manhattan Casino, New York City, New York, U.S.	
120	Win	44–4–7 (65)	Matt Brock	NWS	10	Apr 19, 1917	Cleveland, Ohio, U.S.	
119	Draw	44–4–7 (64)	Eddie Wallace	NWS	12	Mar 26, 1917	Park Theatre, Bridgeport, Connecticut, U.S.	
118	Win	44–4–7 (63)	Eddie Shannon	NWS	6	Mar 19, 1917	Olympia A.C., Philadelphia, Pennsylvania, U.S.	
117	Win	44–4–7 (62)	Tim Droney	NWS	6	Mar 12, 1917	Orpheum Theatre, York, Pennsylvania, U.S.	
116	Loss	44–4–7 (61)	Rocky Kansas	NWS	10	Feb 26, 1917	Broadway Auditorium, Buffalo, New York, U.S.	
115	Win	44–4–7 (60)	Johnny Ray	NWS	6	Feb 3, 1917	National A.C., Philadelphia, Pennsylvania, U.S.	
114	Win	44–4–7 (59)	Johnny Drummie	KO	10 (12)	Jan 18, 1917	Auditorium, Waterbury, Connecticut, U.S.	
113	Win	43–4–7 (59)	Alvie Miller	NWS	12	Dec 11, 1916	Grand Opera House, Youngstown, Ohio, U.S.	
112	Win	43–4–7 (58)	George Chaney	KO	3 (15)	Sep 4, 1916	Cedar Point Arena, Sandusky, Ohio, U.S.	Retained world featherweight title
111	Win	42–4–7 (58)	Johnny O'Leary	NWS	10	Jun 13, 1916	Broadway Auditorium, Buffalo, New York, U.S.	
110	Draw	42–4–7 (57)	Eddie Wallace	NWS	10	May 24, 1916	Sohmer Park, Montreal, Quebec, Canada	
109	Win	42–4–7 (56)	Willie Jackson	TKO	5 (6)	May 8, 1916	Olympia A.C., Philadelphia, Pennsylvania, U.S.	
108	Win	41–4–7 (56)	Harry Donahue	NWS	10	Mar 24, 1916	Harlem S.C., Harlem, New York City, New York, U.S.	
107	Win	41–4–7 (55)	Johnny Ray	NWS	6	Mar 4, 1916	Power Auditorium, Pittsburgh, Pennsylvania, U.S.	
106	Win	41–4–7 (54)	Johnny Creeley	NWS	10	Feb 16, 1916	Hot Springs, Arkansas, U.S.	
105	Win	41–4–7 (53)	Packy Hommey	NWS	6	Jan 31, 1916	Olympia A.C., Philadelphia, Pennsylvania, U.S.	
104	Win	41–4–7 (52)	Frankie Conifrey	NWS	6	Jan 15, 1916	National A.C., Philadelphia, Pennsylvania, U.S.	
103	Win	41–4–7 (51)	Patsy Cline	KO	2 (6)	Jan 8, 1916	National A.C., Philadelphia, Pennsylvania, U.S.	
102	Loss	40–4–7 (51)	Richie Mitchell	NWS	10	Jan 1, 1916	Music Hall Arena, Cincinnati, Ohio, U.S.	
101	Win	40–4–7 (50)	Patsy Brannigan	NWS	10	Dec 2, 1915	Town Hall, Scranton, Pennsylvania, U.S.	
100	Win	40–4–7 (49)	Packy Hommey	NWS	10	Nov 22, 1915	Coliseum, Toledo, Ohio, U.S.	
99	Win	40–4–7 (48)	Bobby Reynolds	NWS	6	Nov 15, 1915	Olympia A.C., Philadelphia, Pennsylvania, U.S.	
98	Win	40–4–7 (47)	Cal Delaney	NWS	12	Oct 11, 1915	Akron, Ohio, U.S.	
97	Loss	40–4–7 (46)	Richie Mitchell	NWS	10	Sep 21, 1915	Auditorium, Milwaukee, Wisconsin, U.S.	
96	Win	40–4–7 (45)	Alvie Miller	NWS	12	Sep 6, 1915	Cedar Point Arena, Sandusky, Ohio, U.S.	
95	Win	40–4–7 (44)	Mel Coogan	NWS	10	May 11, 1915	Broadway S.C., Brooklyn, New York City, New York, U.S.	
94	Win	40–4–7 (43)	Benny Leonard	NWS	10	Apr 29, 1915	Federal A.C., Atlantic Gardens, New York City, New York, U.S.	
93	Win	40–4–7 (42)	Eddie Wallace	NWS	10	Mar 30, 1915	Broadway Arena, Brooklyn, New York City, New York, U.S.	
92	Win	40–4–7 (41)	Kid Williams	NWS	6	Mar 17, 1915	Olympia A.C., Philadelphia, Pennsylvania, U.S.	
91	Win	40–4–7 (40)	Eddie Morgan	NWS	6	Feb 13, 1915	National A.C., Philadelphia, Pennsylvania, U.S.	
90	Win	40–4–7 (39)	Rocky Kansas	NWS	10	Feb 1, 1915	Broadway Auditorium, Buffalo, New York, U.S.	
89	Win	40–4–7 (38)	Eddie Morgan	NWS	6	Jan 23, 1915	National A.C., Philadelphia, Pennsylvania, U.S.	
88	Win	40–4–7 (37)	Frankie Daley	NWS	10	Jan 8, 1915	Coliseum, Toledo, Ohio, U.S.	
87	Loss	40–4–7 (36)	Patsy Brannigan	NWS	6	Jan 1, 1915	Duquesne Garden, Pittsburgh, Pennsylvania, U.S.	
86	Win	40–4–7 (35)	Willie Houck	NWS	6	Dec 14, 1914	Olympia A.C., Philadelphia, Pennsylvania, U.S.	
85	Loss	40–4–7 (34)	Joe Mandot	NWS	12	Dec 7, 1914	Akron, Ohio, U.S.	
84	Win	40–4–7 (33)	Louis Margolis	NWS	10	Jul 2, 1914	Redland Field, Cincinnati, Ohio, U.S.	
83	Win	40–4–7 (32)	Benny Chavez	KO	2 (15)	May 29, 1914	Denver, Colorado, U.S.	
82	Win	39–4–7 (32)	Bobby Reynolds	NWS	8	Apr 22, 1914	Windsor A.C., Windsor, Ontario, Canada	
81	Win	39–4–7 (31)	Kid Julian	NWS	10	Apr 16, 1914	Syracuse, New York, U.S.	
80	Win	39–4–7 (30)	Frankie Daley	NWS	6	Apr 13, 1914	Olympia A.C., Philadelphia, Pennsylvania, U.S.	
79	Win	39–4–7 (29)	Gene Delmont	NWS	8	Apr 6, 1914	Phoenix A.C., Memphis, Tennessee, U.S.	
78	Win	39–4–7 (28)	Tommy Bresnahan	NWS	10	Feb 11, 1914	Alhambra, Syracuse, New York, U.S.	
77	Win	39–4–7 (27)	Charley Thomas	NWS	6	Feb 7, 1914	National A.C., Philadelphia, Pennsylvania, U.S.	
76	Win	39–4–7 (26)	Eddie Moy	NWS	6	Feb 2, 1914	Olympia A.C., Philadelphia, Pennsylvania, U.S.	
75	Win	39–4–7 (25)	Eddie Moy	KO	5 (6)	Jan 5, 1914	Olympia A.C., Philadelphia, Pennsylvania, U.S.	
74	Win	38–4–7 (25)	Eddie O'Keefe	KO	1 (6)	Nov 10, 1913	Olympia A.C., Philadelphia, Pennsylvania, U.S.	
73	Win	37–4–7 (25)	Louis Margolis	KO	7 (10)	Oct 30, 1913	Music Hall Arena, Cincinnati, Ohio, U.S.	
72	Win	36–4–7 (25)	Kid Julian	NWS	10	Oct 8, 1913	St. Nicholas Arena, New York City, New York, U.S.	
71	Win	36–4–7 (24)	Joe Goldberg	NWS	10	Sep 25, 1913	Washington Rink, Rochester, New York, U.S.	
70	Win	36–4–7 (23)	Jimmy Walsh	PTS	12	Sep 16, 1913	Atlas A.A., Boston, Massachusetts, U.S.	
69	Win	35–4–7 (23)	Jimmy Fox	TKO	6 (10)	Jun 10, 1913	Wheelmen's Club, Oakland, California, U.S.	
68	Draw	34–4–7 (23)	Johnny Dundee	PTS	20	Apr 29, 1913	Arena, Vernon, California, U.S.	Retained world featherweight title
67	Win	34–4–6 (23)	George Kirkwood	TKO	6 (10)	Feb 19, 1913	New Star Casino, New York City, New York, U.S.	
66	Win	33–4–6 (23)	Young Driscoll	NWS	10	Feb 4, 1913	Irving A.C., Brooklyn, New York City, New York, U.S.	
65	Win	33–4–6 (22)	Oliver Kirk	TKO	2 (8)	Jan 1, 1913	Future City A.C., Saint Louis, Missouri, U.S.	
64	Win	32–4–6 (22)	Tommy Dixon	NWS	8	Dec 19, 1912	Saint Louis, Missouri, U.S.	
63	Win	32–4–6 (21)	Monte Attell	TKO	9 (12)	Dec 3, 1912	Tuxedo Club, Cleveland, Ohio, U.S.	
62	Win	31–4–6 (21)	Tommy Ginty	KO	4 (6)	Oct 29, 1912	Johnstown, Pennsylvania, U.S.	
61	Win	30–4–6 (21)	Johnny Albanese	NWS	10	Oct 24, 1912	Columbus, Ohio, U.S.	
60	Win	30–4–6 (20)	Eddie O'Keefe	PTS	12	Oct 14, 1912	Cleveland, Ohio, U.S.	
59	Win	29–4–6 (20)	Eddie O'Keefe	NWS	10	Sep 19, 1912	Madison Square Garden, New York City, New York, U.S.	
58	Win	29–4–6 (19)	Jackie Moore	PTS	10	Sep 11, 1912	Tiffin, Ohio, U.S.	
57	Win	28–4–6 (19)	Johnny Dundee	NWS	10	Sep 4, 1912	St. Nicholas Arena, New York City, New York, U.S.	
56	Win	28–4–6 (18)	Tommy Dixon	PTS	12	Jul 4, 1912	Luna Park Motordome, Cleveland, Ohio, U.S.	
55	Win	27–4–6 (18)	Tommy O'Toole	NWS	6	Jun 5, 1912	National A.C., Philadelphia, Pennsylvania, U.S.	
54	Draw	27–4–6 (17)	Jimmy Walsh	PTS	12	May 21, 1912	Pilgrim A.A., Boston, Massachusetts, U.S.	Retained world featherweight title
53	Win	27–4–5 (17)	Frankie Burns	NWS	10	May 14, 1912	St. Nicholas Arena, New York City, New York, U.S.	
52	Win	27–4–5 (16)	Abe Attell	PTS	20	Feb 22, 1912	Arena, Vernon, California, U.S.	Won world featherweight title
51	Win	26–4–5 (16)	Charley White	NWS	12	Dec 23, 1911	Gray's Armory, Cleveland, Ohio, U.S.	
50	Win	26–4–5 (15)	Patsy Brannigan	NWS	10	Nov 29, 1911	Youngstown, Ohio, U.S.	
49	Win	26–4–5 (14)	Frankie Conley	PTS	20	Sep 30, 1911	Arena, Vernon, California, U.S.	
48	Win	25–4–5 (14)	Mexican Joe Rivers	KO	16 (20)	Sep 4, 1911	Arena, Vernon, California, U.S.	
47	Win	24–4–5 (14)	Patsy Kline	PTS	20	Jul 15, 1911	Arena, Vernon, California, U.S.	
46	Draw	23–4–5 (14)	Jimmy Walsh	NWS	12	May 30, 1911	Canton Auditorium, Canton, Ohio, U.S.	
45	Loss	23–4–5 (13)	Mexican Joe Rivers	PTS	20	May 6, 1911	Arena, Vernon, California, U.S.	
44	Draw	23–3–5 (13)	Monte Attell	PTS	10	Mar 24, 1911	Cleveland, Ohio, U.S.	
43	Win	23–3–4 (13)	Kid Ghetto	PTS	10	Mar 16, 1911	Cleveland, Ohio, U.S.	
42	Win	22–3–4 (13)	Johnny Albanese	PTS	10	Mar 8, 1911	Cleveland, Ohio, U.S.	
41	Draw	21–3–4 (13)	Tommy Bresnahan	NWS	10	Feb 27, 1911	Youngstown, Ohio, U.S.	
40	Win	21–3–4 (12)	Jack White	PTS	12	Feb 14, 1911	Columbus, Ohio, U.S.	
39	Win	20–3–4 (12)	Gus Wilson	PTS	10	Jan 11, 1911	Cleveland, Ohio, U.S.	
38	Draw	19–3–4 (12)	Tommy O'Toole	NWS	6	Jan 7, 1911	American A.C., Philadelphia, Pennsylvania, U.S.	
37	Win	19–3–4 (11)	Patsy Brannigan	NWS	12	Jan 2, 1911	Canton, Ohio, U.S.	
36	Win	19–3–4 (10)	Benny Kaufman	NWS	12	Nov 24, 1910	Akron, Ohio, U.S.	
35	Loss	19–3–4 (9)	Abe Attell	PTS	10	Oct 24, 1910	Hippodrome, Kansas City, Missouri, U.S.	
34	Loss	19–2–4 (9)	Benny Kaufman	NWS	6	Sep 29, 1910	Old City Hall, Pittsburgh, Pennsylvania, U.S.	
33	Draw	19–2–4 (8)	Patsy Brannigan	NWS	12	Jul 4, 1910	Akron, Ohio, U.S.	
32	Win	19–2–4 (7)	Al Delmont	PTS	10	Apr 19, 1910	Armory, Boston, Massachusetts, U.S.	
31	Win	18–2–4 (7)	Bobby Tickle	NWS	6	Mar 29, 1910	Armory A.A., Boston, Massachusetts, U.S.	
30	NC	18–2–4 (6)	Biz Mackey	NC	6	Mar 23, 1910	Lorain, Ohio, U.S.	The men began fouling each other and a riot developed in the crowd, so the fight had to be halted
29	Win	18–2–4 (5)	Kid Tyler	KO	3 (10)	Mar 3, 1910	Cleveland, Ohio, U.S.	
28	Draw	17–2–4 (5)	Jack White	NWS	8	Feb 2, 1910	Windsor, Ohio, U.S.	
27	Win	17–2–4 (4)	Tommy Kilbane	PTS	15	Jan 1, 1910	Canton Auditorium, Canton, Ohio, U.S.	
26	Win	16–2–4 (4)	Marty Heffron	PTS	8	Oct 2, 1909	Cleveland, Ohio, U.S.	
25	Win	15–2–4 (4)	Happy Davis	NWS	6	Aug 9, 1909	Duquesne Garden, Pittsburgh, Pennsylvania, U.S.	
24	Win	15–2–4 (3)	Jeff Gaffney	KO	4 (6)	Jun 30, 1909	Duquesne Garden, Pittsburgh, Pennsylvania, U.S.	
23	Draw	14–2–4 (3)	Jack White	PTS	12	Jun 14, 1909	Akron, Ohio, U.S.	
22	Win	14–2–3 (3)	Cloyce Yeager	NWS	10	Jun 1, 1909	Findlay, Ohio, U.S.	
21	Win	14–2–3 (2)	Mike Bartley	KO	5 (6)	May 7, 1909	Duquesne Garden, Pittsburgh, Pennsylvania, U.S.	
20	Loss	13–2–3 (2)	Biz Mackey	TKO	5 (12)	Mar 29, 1909	Akron, Ohio, U.S.	
19	Win	13–1–3 (2)	Frank LeMaster	PTS	8	Mar 11, 1909	Akron, Ohio, U.S.	
18	Win	12–1–3 (2)	Clyde LeMasters	PTS	8	Feb 18, 1909	Akron, Ohio, U.S.	
17	Win	11–1–3 (2)	Johnny Whittaker	NWS	12	Feb 4, 1909	Sawyerwood AC, Akron, Ohio, U.S.	
16	Draw	11–1–3 (1)	Jack White	PTS	10	Jan 15, 1909	Dayton, Ohio, U.S.	
15	Draw	11–1–2 (1)	Young Joe Grim	NWS	12	Dec 14, 1908	Youngstown, Ohio, U.S.	
14	Win	11–1–2	Clyde LeMasters	PTS	10	Dec 3, 1908	Cleveland, Ohio, U.S.	
13	Win	10–1–2	Tommy Kilbane	PTS	25	Nov 25, 1908	Cleveland, Ohio, U.S.	
12	Win	9–1–2	Milburn Saylor	PTS	10	Jun 5, 1908	Dayton, Ohio, U.S.	
11	Win	8–1–2	Battling Terry	PTS	10	May 30, 1908	Coliseum, New Castle, Pennsylvania, U.S.	
10	Win	7–1–2	Paul Kohler	PTS	6	May 22, 1908	Cleveland, Ohio, U.S.	
9	Draw	6–1–2	Tommy Lynch	PTS	10	Apr 13, 1908	Coliseum, New Castle, Pennsylvania, U.S.	
8	Win	6–1–1	Herman Zahnizer	KO	9 (10)	Mar 16, 1908	Coliseum, New Castle, Pennsylvania, U.S.	
7	Loss	5–1–1	Tommy Kilbane	PTS	6	Mar 3, 1908	Cleveland, Ohio, U.S.	
6	Win	5–0–1	Paul Kohler	PTS	6	Mar 1, 1908	Cleveland, Ohio, U.S.	
5	Draw	4–0–1	Tommy Kilbane	PTS	4	Feb 10, 1908	Cleveland, Ohio, U.S.	
4	Win	4–0	Tommy Kilbane	PTS	3	Jan 1, 1908	Lorain, Ohio, U.S.	
3	Win	3–0	Kid Campbell	KO	6 (6)	Dec 25, 1907	Cleveland, Ohio, U.S.	
2	Win	2–0	Tommy Burns	PTS	3	Dec 18, 1907	Cleveland, Ohio, U.S.	
1	Win	1–0	Tom Mangan	PTS	3	Dec 2, 1907	Cleveland, Ohio, U.S.	

=== Unofficial record ===
143 fights	110 wins	17 losses
By knockout	24	3
By decision	86	14
Draws	15	
No contests	1	

Record with the inclusion of newspaper decisions in the win/loss/draw column.

No.	Result	Record	Opponent	Type	Round	Date	Location	Notes
143	Loss	110–17–15 (1)	Eugène Criqui	TKO	6 (15)	Jun 2, 1923	Polo Grounds, New York City, New York, U.S.	Lost NYSAC featherweight title
142	Win	110–16–15 (1)	Danny Frush	KO	7 (12)	Sep 17, 1920	Dunn Field, Cleveland, Ohio, U.S.	Retained NYSAC featherweight title
141	Win	109–16–15 (1)	Freddie Jacks	NWS	10	May 25, 1920	Dunn Field, Cleveland, Ohio, U.S.	
140	Win	108–16–15 (1)	Artie Root	NWS	10	Jul 28, 1920	Cleveland, Ohio, U.S.	
139	Loss	107–16–15 (1)	Andy Chaney	NWS	8	Jun 2, 1920	Ice Palace, Philadelphia, Pennsylvania, U.S.	
138	Loss	107–15–15 (1)	Harry Brown	NWS	6	May 24, 1920	Shibe Park, Philadelphia, Pennsylvania, U.S.	
137	Win	107–14–15 (1)	Alvie Miller	KO	7 (10)	Apr 21, 1920	Opera House, Lorain, Ohio, U.S.	
136	Loss	106–14–15 (1)	Benny Valger	NWS	8	Feb 25, 1920	Newark Athletic Club, Newark, New Jersey, U.S.	
135	Win	106–13–15 (1)	Johnny Murray	NWS	6	Jan 24, 1920	National A.C., Philadelphia, Pennsylvania, U.S.	
134	Win	105–13–15 (1)	Al Shubert	NWS	6	Jan 1, 1920	Olympia A.C., Philadelphia, Pennsylvania, U.S.	
133	Loss	104–13–15 (1)	Andy Chaney	NWS	8	Dec 29, 1919	4th Regiment Armory, Jersey City, New Jersey, U.S.	
132	Win	104–12–15 (1)	Eddie Morgan	NWS	6	Sep 20, 1919	National A.C., Philadelphia, Pennsylvania, U.S.	
131	Win	103–12–15 (1)	Frankie Burns	TKO	5 (8)	Sep 16, 1919	International League Ballpark, Jersey City, New Jersey, U.S.	
130	Win	102–12–15 (1)	Joe Fox	NWS	6	Jul 28, 1919	Shibe Park, Philadelphia, Pennsylvania, U.S.	
129	Win	101–12–15 (1)	Ralph Brady	NWS	10	May 14, 1919	Grand Theater, Cleveland, Ohio, U.S.	
128	Win	100–12–15 (1)	Johnny Maloney	TKO	6 (6)	Apr 19, 1919	National A.C., Philadelphia, Pennsylvania, U.S.	
127	Win	99–12–15 (1)	Jack Lawler	NWS	10	Apr 12, 1919	Charleston, West Virginia, U.S.	
126	Win	98–12–15 (1)	Artie O'Leary	NWS	6	Apr 5, 1919	National A.C., Philadelphia, Pennsylvania, U.S.	
125	Win	97–12–15 (1)	Johnny Mealey	KO	2 (6)	Mar 31, 1919	Olympia A.C., Philadelphia, Pennsylvania, U.S.	
124	Loss	96–12–15 (1)	Frankie Brown	NWS	6	Mar 10, 1919	Olympia A.C., Philadelphia, Pennsylvania, U.S.	
123	Loss	96–11–15 (1)	Benny Leonard	TKO	3 (6)	Jul 25, 1917	Shibe Park, Philadelphia, Pennsylvania, U.S.	
122	Win	96–10–15 (1)	Frankie Fleming	NWS	10	May 24, 1917	Sohmer Park, Montreal, Quebec, Canada	
121	Win	95–10–15 (1)	Freddie Welsh	NWS	10	May 1, 1917	Manhattan Casino, New York City, New York, U.S.	
120	Win	94–10–15 (1)	Matt Brock	NWS	10	Apr 19, 1917	Cleveland, Ohio, U.S.	
119	Draw	93–10–15 (1)	Eddie Wallace	NWS	12	Mar 26, 1917	Park Theatre, Bridgeport, Connecticut, U.S.	
118	Win	93–10–14 (1)	Eddie Shannon	NWS	6	Mar 19, 1917	Olympia A.C., Philadelphia, Pennsylvania, U.S.	
117	Win	92–10–14 (1)	Tim Droney	NWS	6	Mar 12, 1917	Orpheum Theatre, York, Pennsylvania, U.S.	
116	Loss	91–10–14 (1)	Rocky Kansas	NWS	10	Feb 26, 1917	Broadway Auditorium, Buffalo, New York, U.S.	
115	Win	91–9–14 (1)	Johnny Ray	NWS	6	Feb 3, 1917	National A.C., Philadelphia, Pennsylvania, U.S.	
114	Win	90–9–14 (1)	Johnny Drummie	KO	10 (12)	Jan 18, 1917	Auditorium, Waterbury, Connecticut, U.S.	
113	Win	89–9–14 (1)	Alvie Miller	NWS	12	Dec 11, 1916	Grand Opera House, Youngstown, Ohio, U.S.	
112	Win	88–9–14 (1)	George Chaney	KO	3 (15)	Sep 4, 1916	Cedar Point Arena, Sandusky, Ohio, U.S.	Retained world featherweight title
111	Win	87–9–14 (1)	Johnny O'Leary	NWS	10	Jun 13, 1916	Broadway Auditorium, Buffalo, New York, U.S.	
110	Draw	86–9–14 (1)	Eddie Wallace	NWS	10	May 24, 1916	Sohmer Park, Montreal, Quebec, Canada	
109	Win	86–9–13 (1)	Willie Jackson	TKO	5 (6)	May 8, 1916	Olympia A.C., Philadelphia, Pennsylvania, U.S.	
108	Win	85–9–13 (1)	Harry Donahue	NWS	10	Mar 24, 1916	Harlem S.C., Harlem, New York City, New York, U.S.	
107	Win	84–9–13 (1)	Johnny Ray	NWS	6	Mar 4, 1916	Power Auditorium, Pittsburgh, Pennsylvania, U.S.	
106	Win	83–9–13 (1)	Johnny Creeley	NWS	10	Feb 16, 1916	Hot Springs, Arkansas, U.S.	
105	Win	82–9–13 (1)	Packy Hommey	NWS	6	Jan 31, 1916	Olympia A.C., Philadelphia, Pennsylvania, U.S.	
104	Win	81–9–13 (1)	Frankie Conifrey	NWS	6	Jan 15, 1916	National A.C., Philadelphia, Pennsylvania, U.S.	
103	Win	80–9–13 (1)	Patsy Cline	KO	2 (6)	Jan 8, 1916	National A.C., Philadelphia, Pennsylvania, U.S.	
102	Loss	79–9–13 (1)	Richie Mitchell	NWS	10	Jan 1, 1916	Music Hall Arena, Cincinnati, Ohio, U.S.	
101	Win	79–8–13 (1)	Patsy Brannigan	NWS	10	Dec 2, 1915	Town Hall, Scranton, Pennsylvania, U.S.	
100	Win	78–8–13 (1)	Packy Hommey	NWS	10	Nov 22, 1915	Coliseum, Toledo, Ohio, U.S.	
99	Win	77–8–13 (1)	Bobby Reynolds	NWS	6	Nov 15, 1915	Olympia A.C., Philadelphia, Pennsylvania, U.S.	
98	Win	76–8–13 (1)	Cal Delaney	NWS	12	Oct 11, 1915	Akron, Ohio, U.S.	
97	Loss	75–8–13 (1)	Richie Mitchell	NWS	10	Sep 21, 1915	Auditorium, Milwaukee, Wisconsin, U.S.	
96	Win	75–7–13 (1)	Alvie Miller	NWS	12	Sep 6, 1915	Cedar Point Arena, Sandusky, Ohio, U.S.	
95	Win	74–7–13 (1)	Mel Coogan	NWS	10	May 11, 1915	Broadway S.C., Brooklyn, New York City, New York, U.S.	
94	Win	73–7–13 (1)	Benny Leonard	NWS	10	Apr 29, 1915	Federal A.C., Atlantic Gardens, New York City, New York, U.S.	
93	Win	72–7–13 (1)	Eddie Wallace	NWS	10	Mar 30, 1915	Broadway Arena, Brooklyn, New York City, New York, U.S.	
92	Win	71–7–13 (1)	Kid Williams	NWS	6	Mar 17, 1915	Olympia A.C., Philadelphia, Pennsylvania, U.S.	
91	Win	70–7–13 (1)	Eddie Morgan	NWS	6	Feb 13, 1915	National A.C., Philadelphia, Pennsylvania, U.S.	
90	Win	69–7–13 (1)	Rocky Kansas	NWS	10	Feb 1, 1915	Broadway Auditorium, Buffalo, New York, U.S.	
89	Win	68–7–13 (1)	Eddie Morgan	NWS	6	Jan 23, 1915	National A.C., Philadelphia, Pennsylvania, U.S.	
88	Win	67–7–13 (1)	Frankie Daley	NWS	10	Jan 8, 1915	Coliseum, Toledo, Ohio, U.S.	
87	Loss	66–7–13 (1)	Patsy Brannigan	NWS	6	Jan 1, 1915	Duquesne Garden, Pittsburgh, Pennsylvania, U.S.	
86	Win	66–6–13 (1)	Willie Houck	NWS	6	Dec 14, 1914	Olympia A.C., Philadelphia, Pennsylvania, U.S.	
85	Loss	65–6–13 (1)	Joe Mandot	NWS	12	Dec 7, 1914	Akron, Ohio, U.S.	
84	Win	65–5–13 (1)	Louis Margolis	NWS	10	Jul 2, 1914	Redland Field, Cincinnati, Ohio, U.S.	
83	Win	64–5–13 (1)	Benny Chavez	KO	2 (15)	May 29, 1914	Denver, Colorado, U.S.	
82	Win	63–5–13 (1)	Bobby Reynolds	NWS	8	Apr 22, 1914	Windsor A.C., Windsor, Ontario, Canada	
81	Win	62–5–13 (1)	Kid Julian	NWS	10	Apr 16, 1914	Syracuse, New York, U.S.	
80	Win	61–5–13 (1)	Frankie Daley	NWS	6	Apr 13, 1914	Olympia A.C., Philadelphia, Pennsylvania, U.S.	
79	Win	60–5–13 (1)	Gene Delmont	NWS	8	Apr 6, 1914	Phoenix A.C., Memphis, Tennessee, U.S.	
78	Win	59–5–13 (1)	Tommy Bresnahan	NWS	10	Feb 11, 1914	Alhambra, Syracuse, New York, U.S.	
77	Win	58–5–13 (1)	Charley Thomas	NWS	6	Feb 7, 1914	National A.C., Philadelphia, Pennsylvania, U.S.	
76	Win	57–5–13 (1)	Eddie Moy	NWS	6	Feb 2, 1914	Olympia A.C., Philadelphia, Pennsylvania, U.S.	
75	Win	56–5–13 (1)	Eddie Moy	KO	5 (6)	Jan 5, 1914	Olympia A.C., Philadelphia, Pennsylvania, U.S.	
74	Win	55–5–13 (1)	Eddie O'Keefe	KO	1 (6)	Nov 10, 1913	Olympia A.C., Philadelphia, Pennsylvania, U.S.	
73	Win	54–5–13 (1)	Louis Margolis	KO	7 (10)	Oct 30, 1913	Music Hall Arena, Cincinnati, Ohio, U.S.	
72	Win	53–5–13 (1)	Kid Julian	NWS	10	Oct 8, 1913	St. Nicholas Arena, New York City, New York, U.S.	
71	Win	52–5–13 (1)	Joe Goldberg	NWS	10	Sep 25, 1913	Washington Rink, Rochester, New York, U.S.	
70	Win	51–5–13 (1)	Jimmy Walsh	PTS	12	Sep 16, 1913	Atlas A.A., Boston, Massachusetts, U.S.	
69	Win	50–5–13 (1)	Jimmy Fox	TKO	6 (10)	Jun 10, 1913	Wheelmen's Club, Oakland, California, U.S.	
68	Draw	49–5–13 (1)	Johnny Dundee	PTS	20	Apr 29, 1913	Arena, Vernon, California, U.S.	Retained world featherweight title
67	Win	49–5–12 (1)	George Kirkwood	TKO	6 (10)	Feb 19, 1913	New Star Casino, New York City, New York, U.S.	
66	Win	48–5–12 (1)	Young Driscoll	NWS	10	Feb 4, 1913	Irving A.C., Brooklyn, New York City, New York, U.S.	
65	Win	47–5–12 (1)	Oliver Kirk	TKO	2 (8)	Jan 1, 1913	Future City A.C., Saint Louis, Missouri, U.S.	
64	Win	46–5–12 (1)	Tommy Dixon	NWS	8	Dec 19, 1912	Saint Louis, Missouri, U.S.	
63	Win	45–5–12 (1)	Monte Attell	TKO	9 (12)	Dec 3, 1912	Tuxedo Club, Cleveland, Ohio, U.S.	
62	Win	44–5–12 (1)	Tommy Ginty	KO	4 (6)	Oct 29, 1912	Johnstown, Pennsylvania, U.S.	
61	Win	43–5–12 (1)	Johnny Albanese	NWS	10	Oct 24, 1912	Columbus, Ohio, U.S.	
60	Win	42–5–12 (1)	Eddie O'Keefe	PTS	12	Oct 14, 1912	Cleveland, Ohio, U.S.	
59	Win	41–5–12 (1)	Eddie O'Keefe	NWS	10	Sep 19, 1912	Madison Square Garden, New York City, New York, U.S.	
58	Win	40–5–12 (1)	Jackie Moore	PTS	10	Sep 11, 1912	Tiffin, Ohio, U.S.	
57	Win	39–5–12 (1)	Johnny Dundee	NWS	10	Sep 4, 1912	St. Nicholas Arena, New York City, New York, U.S.	
56	Win	38–5–12 (1)	Tommy Dixon	PTS	12	Jul 4, 1912	Luna Park Motordome, Cleveland, Ohio, U.S.	
55	Win	37–5–12 (1)	Tommy O'Toole	NWS	6	Jun 5, 1912	National A.C., Philadelphia, Pennsylvania, U.S.	
54	Draw	36–5–12 (1)	Jimmy Walsh	PTS	12	May 21, 1912	Pilgrim A.A., Boston, Massachusetts, U.S.	Retained world featherweight title
53	Win	36–5–11 (1)	Frankie Burns	NWS	10	May 14, 1912	St. Nicholas Arena, New York City, New York, U.S.	
52	Win	35–5–11 (1)	Abe Attell	PTS	20	Feb 22, 1912	Arena, Vernon, California, U.S.	Won world featherweight title
51	Win	34–5–11 (1)	Charley White	NWS	12	Dec 23, 1911	Gray's Armory, Cleveland, Ohio, U.S.	
50	Win	33–5–11 (1)	Patsy Brannigan	NWS	10	Nov 29, 1911	Youngstown, Ohio, U.S.	
49	Win	32–5–11 (1)	Frankie Conley	PTS	20	Sep 30, 1911	Arena, Vernon, California, U.S.	
48	Win	31–5–11 (1)	Mexican Joe Rivers	KO	16 (20)	Sep 4, 1911	Arena, Vernon, California, U.S.	
47	Win	30–5–11 (1)	Patsy Kline	PTS	20	Jul 15, 1911	Arena, Vernon, California, U.S.	
46	Draw	29–5–11 (1)	Jimmy Walsh	NWS	12	May 30, 1911	Canton Auditorium, Canton, Ohio, U.S.	
45	Loss	29–5–10 (1)	Mexican Joe Rivers	PTS	20	May 6, 1911	Arena, Vernon, California, U.S.	
44	Draw	29–4–10 (1)	Monte Attell	PTS	10	Mar 24, 1911	Cleveland, Ohio, U.S.	
43	Win	29–4–9 (1)	Kid Ghetto	PTS	10	Mar 16, 1911	Cleveland, Ohio, U.S.	
42	Win	28–4–9 (1)	Johnny Albanese	PTS	10	Mar 8, 1911	Cleveland, Ohio, U.S.	
41	Draw	27–4–9 (1)	Tommy Bresnahan	NWS	10	Feb 27, 1911	Youngstown, Ohio, U.S.	
40	Win	27–4–8 (1)	Jack White	PTS	12	Feb 14, 1911	Columbus, Ohio, U.S.	
39	Win	26–4–8 (1)	Gus Wilson	PTS	10	Jan 11, 1911	Cleveland, Ohio, U.S.	
38	Draw	25–4–8 (1)	Tommy O'Toole	NWS	6	Jan 7, 1911	American A.C., Philadelphia, Pennsylvania, U.S.	
37	Win	25–4–7 (1)	Patsy Brannigan	NWS	12	Jan 2, 1911	Canton, Ohio, U.S.	
36	Win	24–4–7 (1)	Benny Kaufman	NWS	12	Nov 24, 1910	Akron, Ohio, U.S.	
35	Loss	23–4–7 (1)	Abe Attell	PTS	10	Oct 24, 1910	Hippodrome, Kansas City, Missouri, U.S.	
34	Loss	23–3–7 (1)	Benny Kaufman	NWS	6	Sep 29, 1910	Old City Hall, Pittsburgh, Pennsylvania, U.S.	
33	Draw	23–2–7 (1)	Patsy Brannigan	NWS	12	Jul 4, 1910	Akron, Ohio, U.S.	
32	Win	23–2–6 (1)	Al Delmont	PTS	10	Apr 19, 1910	Armory, Boston, Massachusetts, U.S.	
31	Win	22–2–6 (1)	Bobby Tickle	NWS	6	Mar 29, 1910	Armory A.A., Boston, Massachusetts, U.S.	
30	NC	21–2–6 (1)	Biz Mackey	NC	6	Mar 23, 1910	Lorain, Ohio, U.S.	The men began fouling each other and a riot developed in the crowd, so the fight had to be halted
29	Win	21–2–6	Kid Tyler	KO	3 (10)	Mar 3, 1910	Cleveland, Ohio, U.S.	
28	Draw	20–2–6	Jack White	NWS	8	Feb 2, 1910	Windsor, Ohio, U.S.	
27	Win	20–2–5	Tommy Kilbane	PTS	15	Jan 1, 1910	Canton Auditorium, Canton, Ohio, U.S.	
26	Win	19–2–5	Marty Heffron	PTS	8	Oct 2, 1909	Cleveland, Ohio, U.S.	
25	Win	18–2–5	Happy Davis	NWS	6	Aug 9, 1909	Duquesne Garden, Pittsburgh, Pennsylvania, U.S.	
24	Win	17–2–5	Jeff Gaffney	KO	4 (6)	Jun 30, 1909	Duquesne Garden, Pittsburgh, Pennsylvania, U.S.	
23	Draw	16–2–5	Jack White	PTS	12	Jun 14, 1909	Akron, Ohio, U.S.	
22	Win	16–2–4	Cloyce Yeager	NWS	10	Jun 1, 1909	Findlay, Ohio, U.S.	
21	Win	15–2–4	Mike Bartley	KO	5 (6)	May 7, 1909	Duquesne Garden, Pittsburgh, Pennsylvania, U.S.	
20	Loss	14–2–4	Biz Mackey	TKO	5 (12)	Mar 29, 1909	Akron, Ohio, U.S.	
19	Win	14–1–4	Frank LeMaster	PTS	8	Mar 11, 1909	Akron, Ohio, U.S.	
18	Win	13–1–4	Clyde LeMasters	PTS	8	Feb 18, 1909	Akron, Ohio, U.S.	
17	Win	12–1–4	Johnny Whittaker	NWS	12	Feb 4, 1909	Sawyerwood AC, Akron, Ohio, U.S.	
16	Draw	11–1–4	Jack White	PTS	10	Jan 15, 1909	Dayton, Ohio, U.S.	
15	Draw	11–1–3	Young Joe Grim	NWS	12	Dec 14, 1908	Youngstown, Ohio, U.S.	
14	Win	11–1–2	Clyde LeMasters	PTS	10	Dec 3, 1908	Cleveland, Ohio, U.S.	
13	Win	10–1–2	Tommy Kilbane	PTS	25	Nov 25, 1908	Cleveland, Ohio, U.S.	
12	Win	9–1–2	Milburn Saylor	PTS	10	Jun 5, 1908	Dayton, Ohio, U.S.	
11	Win	8–1–2	Battling Terry	PTS	10	May 30, 1908	Coliseum, New Castle, Pennsylvania, U.S.	
10	Win	7–1–2	Paul Kohler	PTS	6	May 22, 1908	Cleveland, Ohio, U.S.	
9	Draw	6–1–2	Tommy Lynch	PTS	10	Apr 13, 1908	Coliseum, New Castle, Pennsylvania, U.S.	
8	Win	6–1–1	Herman Zahnizer	KO	9 (10)	Mar 16, 1908	Coliseum, New Castle, Pennsylvania, U.S.	
7	Loss	5–1–1	Tommy Kilbane	PTS	6	Mar 3, 1908	Cleveland, Ohio, U.S.	
6	Win	5–0–1	Paul Kohler	PTS	6	Mar 1, 1908	Cleveland, Ohio, U.S.	
5	Draw	4–0–1	Tommy Kilbane	PTS	4	Feb 10, 1908	Cleveland, Ohio, U.S.	
4	Win	4–0	Tommy Kilbane	PTS	3	Jan 1, 1908	Lorain, Ohio, U.S.	
3	Win	3–0	Kid Campbell	KO	6 (6)	Dec 25, 1907	Cleveland, Ohio, U.S.	
2	Win	2–0	Tommy Burns	PTS	3	Dec 18, 1907	Cleveland, Ohio, U.S.	
1	Win	1–0	Tom Mangan	PTS	3	Dec 2, 1907	Cleveland, Ohio, U.S.	

Achievements
Preceded by Abe Attell	World Featherweight Champion; February 22, 1912 – June 2, 1923	Succeeded by Eugène Criqui
