= List of Jews in sports =

This list of Jewish athletes in sports contains athletes who are Jewish and have attained outstanding achievements in sports. The topic of Jewish participation in sports is discussed extensively in academic and popular literature.

Sports have been a historical avenue for Jewish people to overcome obstacles toward their participation in secular society. Jewish people immigrated from the countries where they had faced persecution. Some made Aliyah to the State of Israel, while others moved elsewhere.

The criteria for inclusion in this list are:

- 1–3 places winners at major international tournaments;
- For team sports, winning in preliminary competitions of finals at major international tournaments, or playing for several seasons for clubs of major national leagues; or
- Holders of past and current world records.

Boldface denotes a current competitor.

To be included in the list, one does not necessarily have to practice Judaism. Some members of the list may practice another faith or not at all; they do have to be of either ethnic Jewish descent or other Judaism-related background.

== American football ==
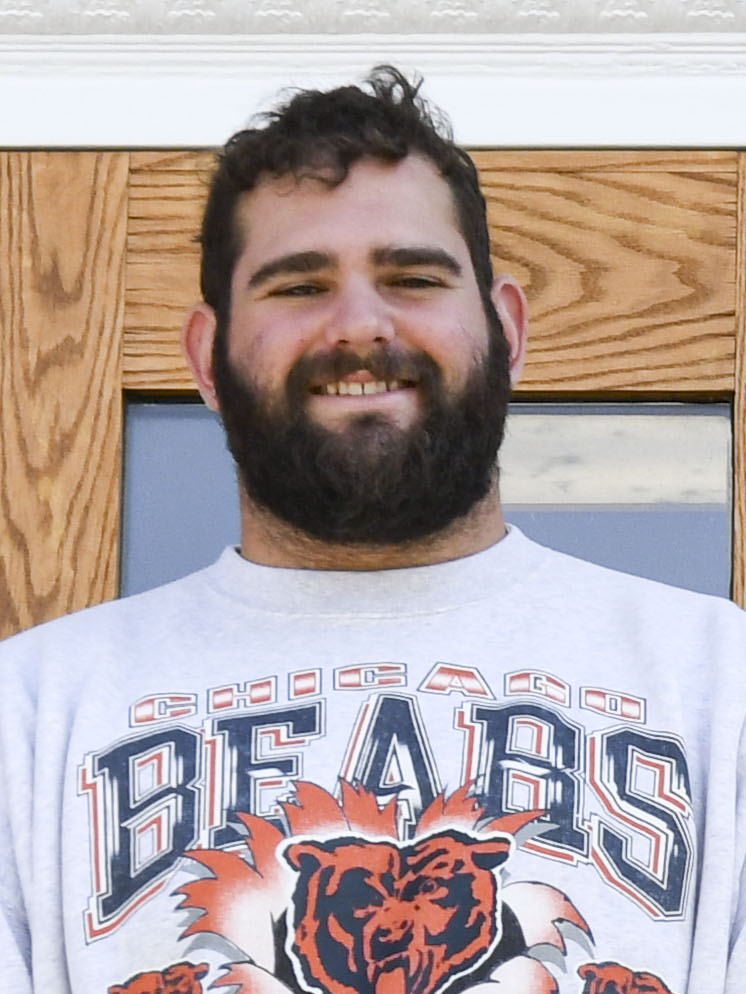
Jake Curhan

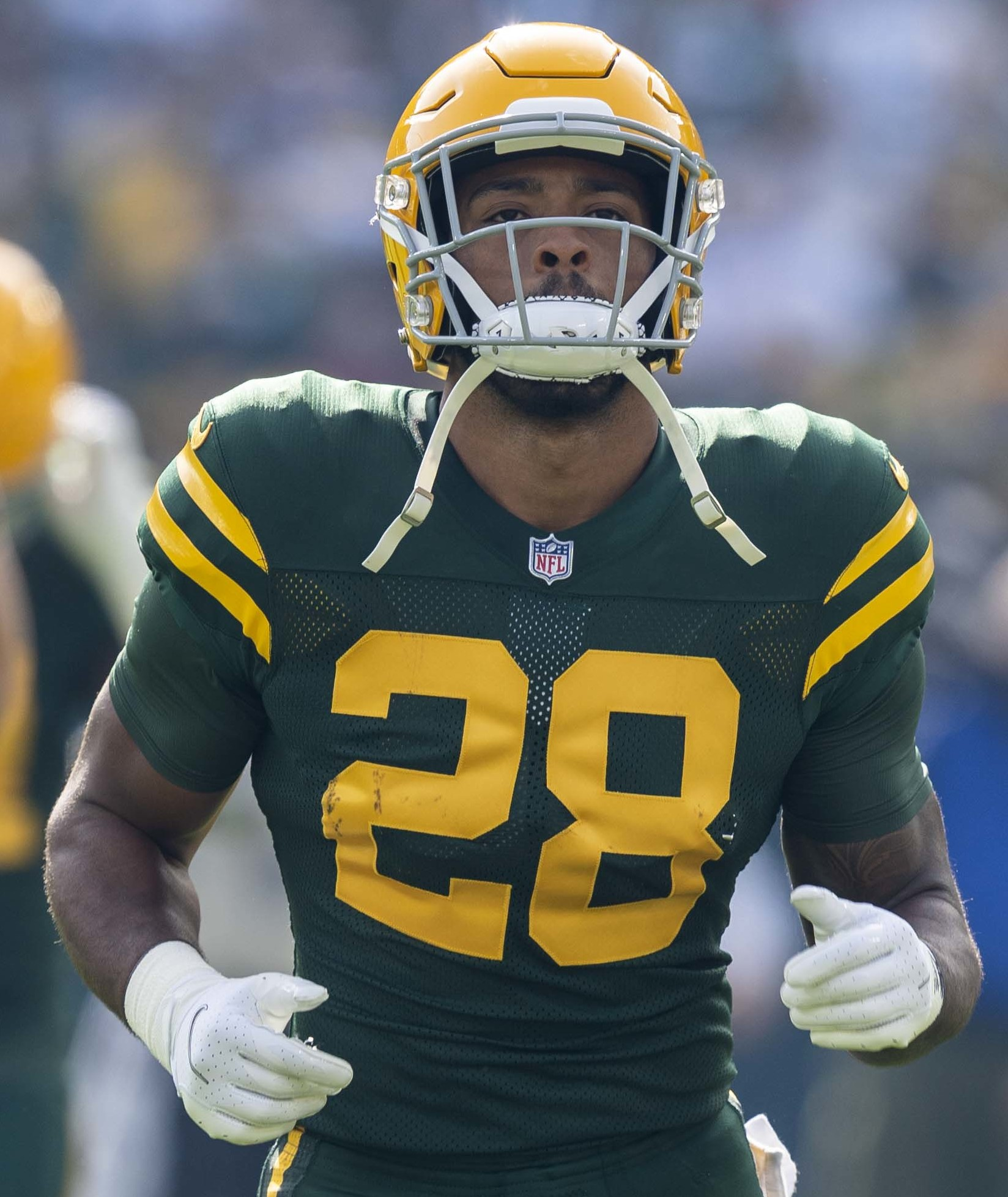
A. J. Dillon

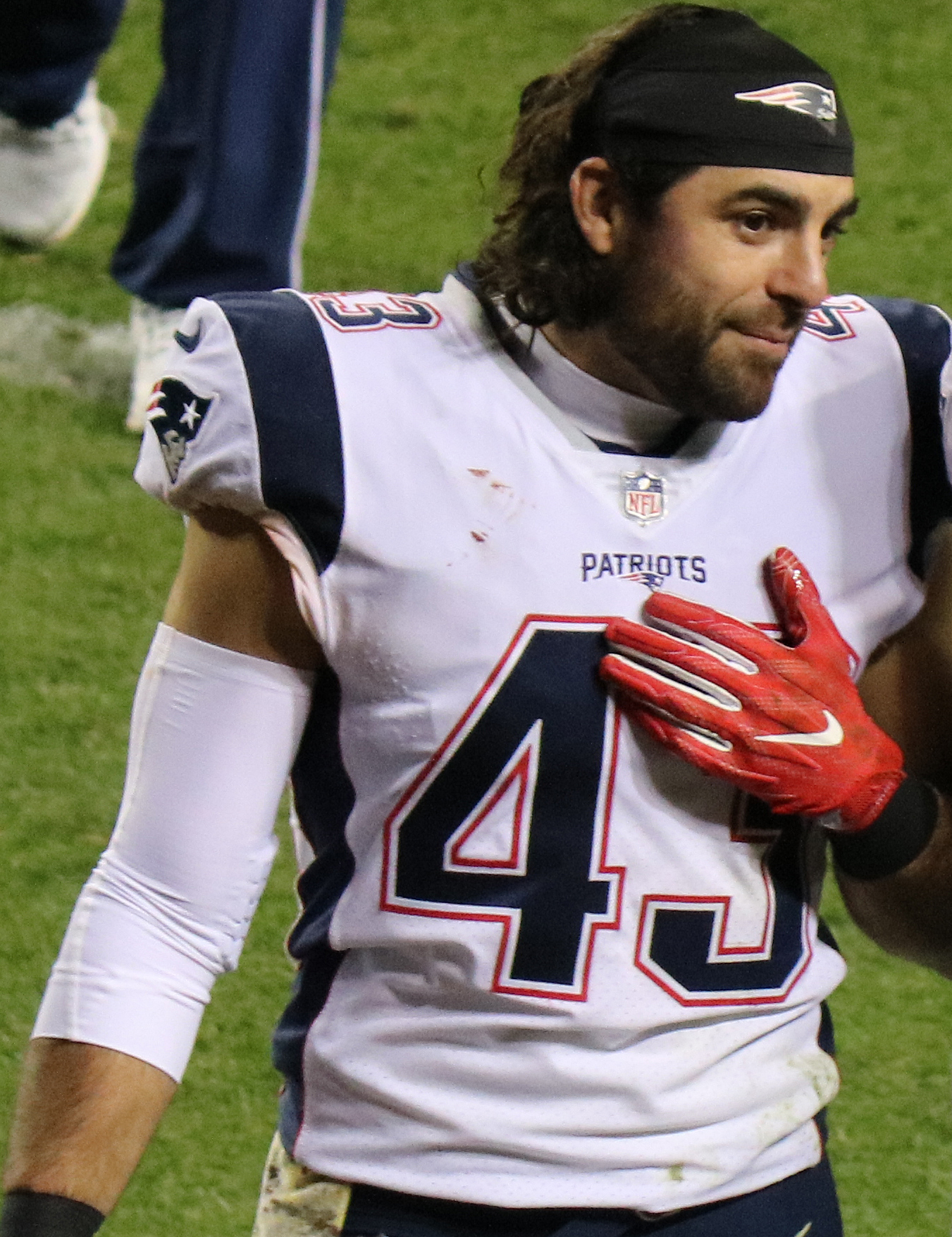
Nate Ebner

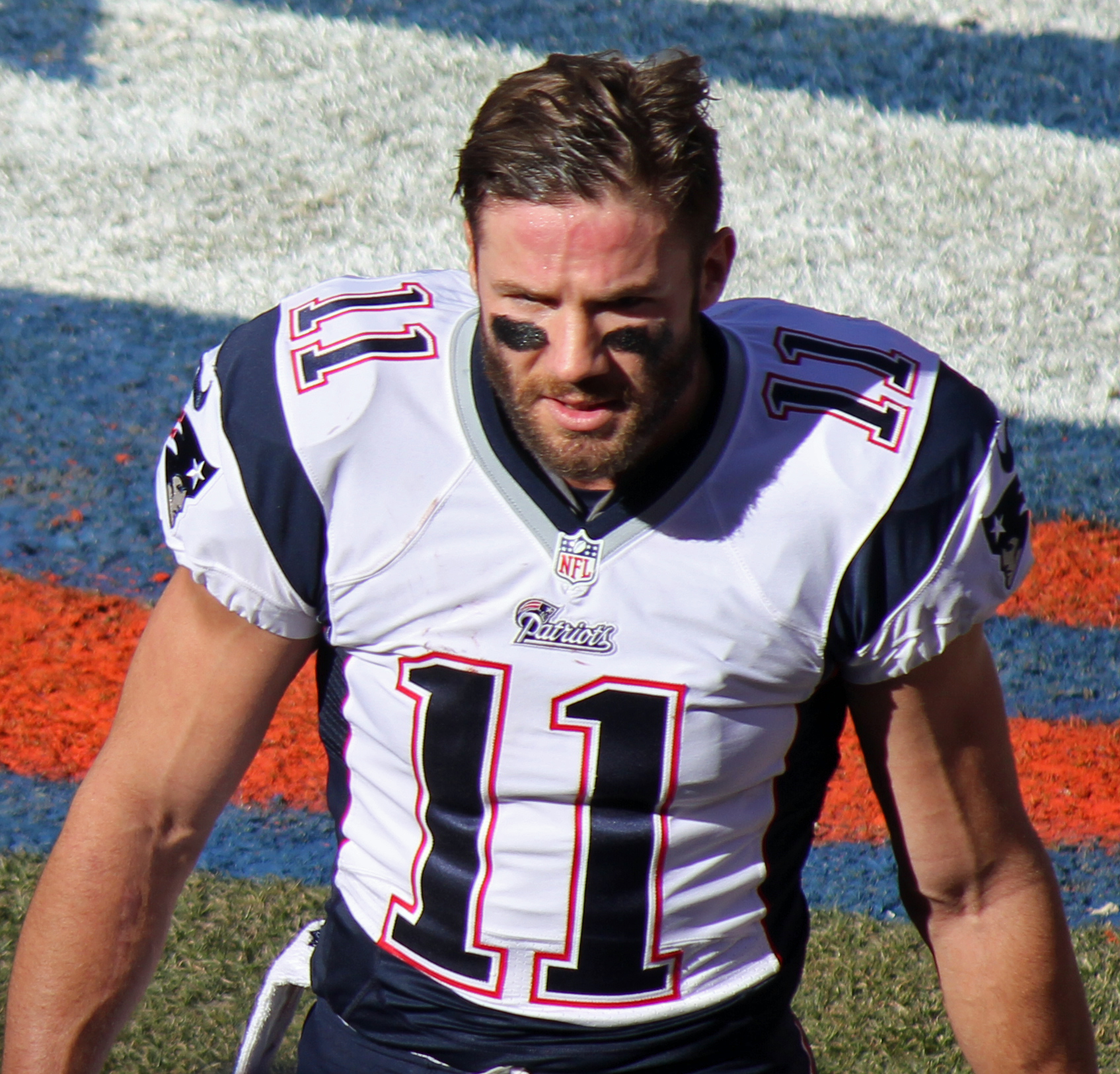
Julian Edelman

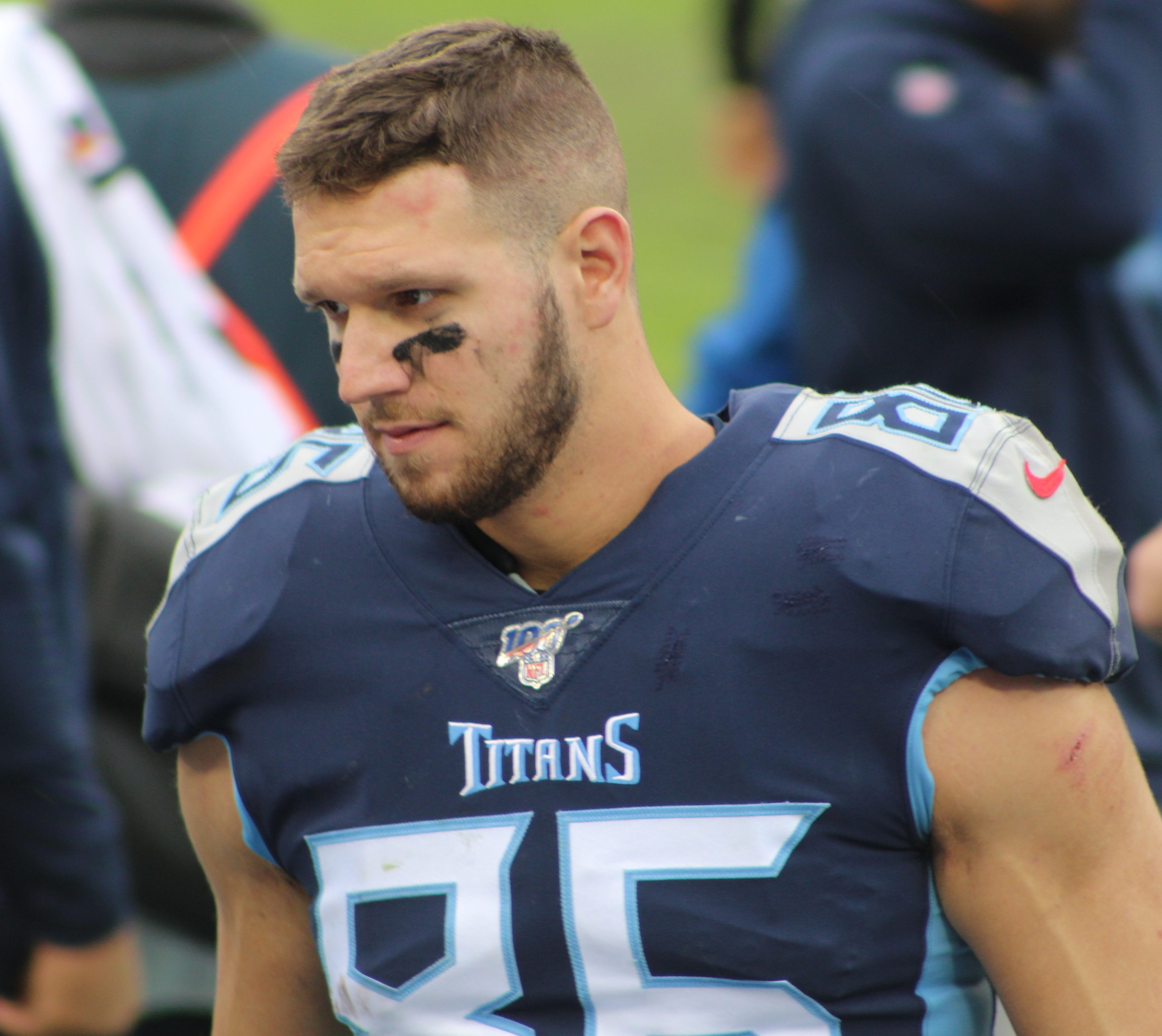
Anthony Firkser

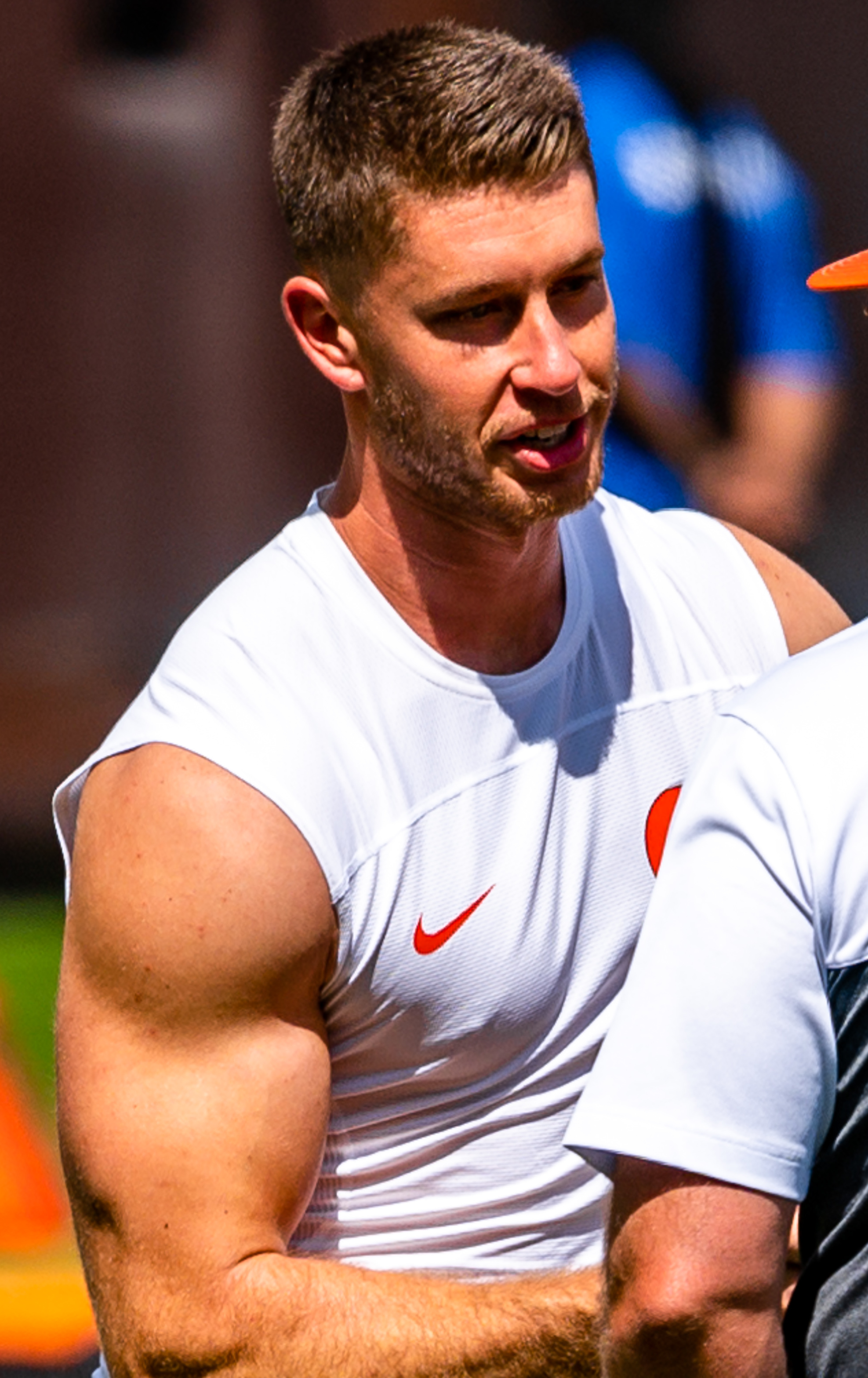
Greg Joseph

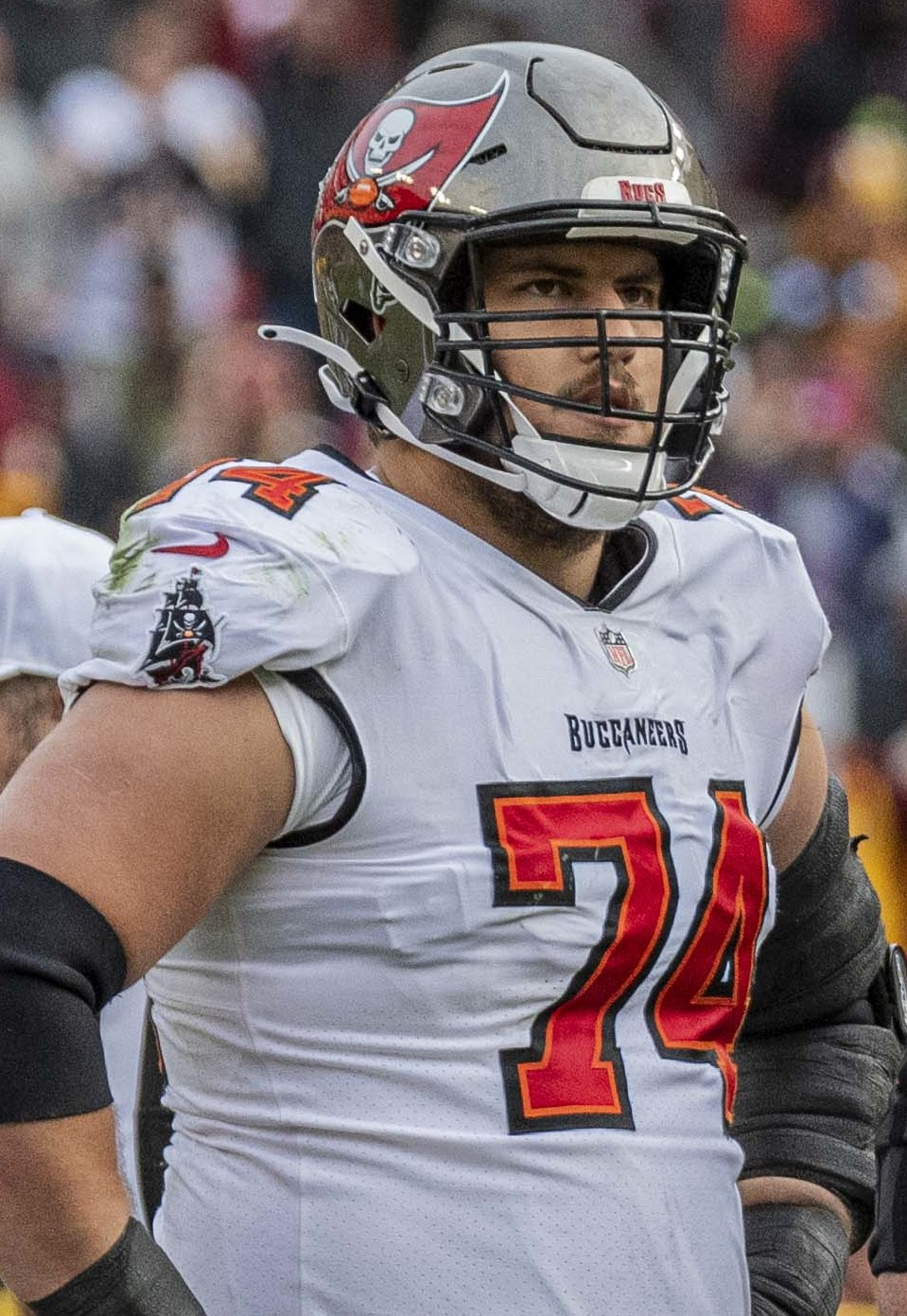
Ali Marpet

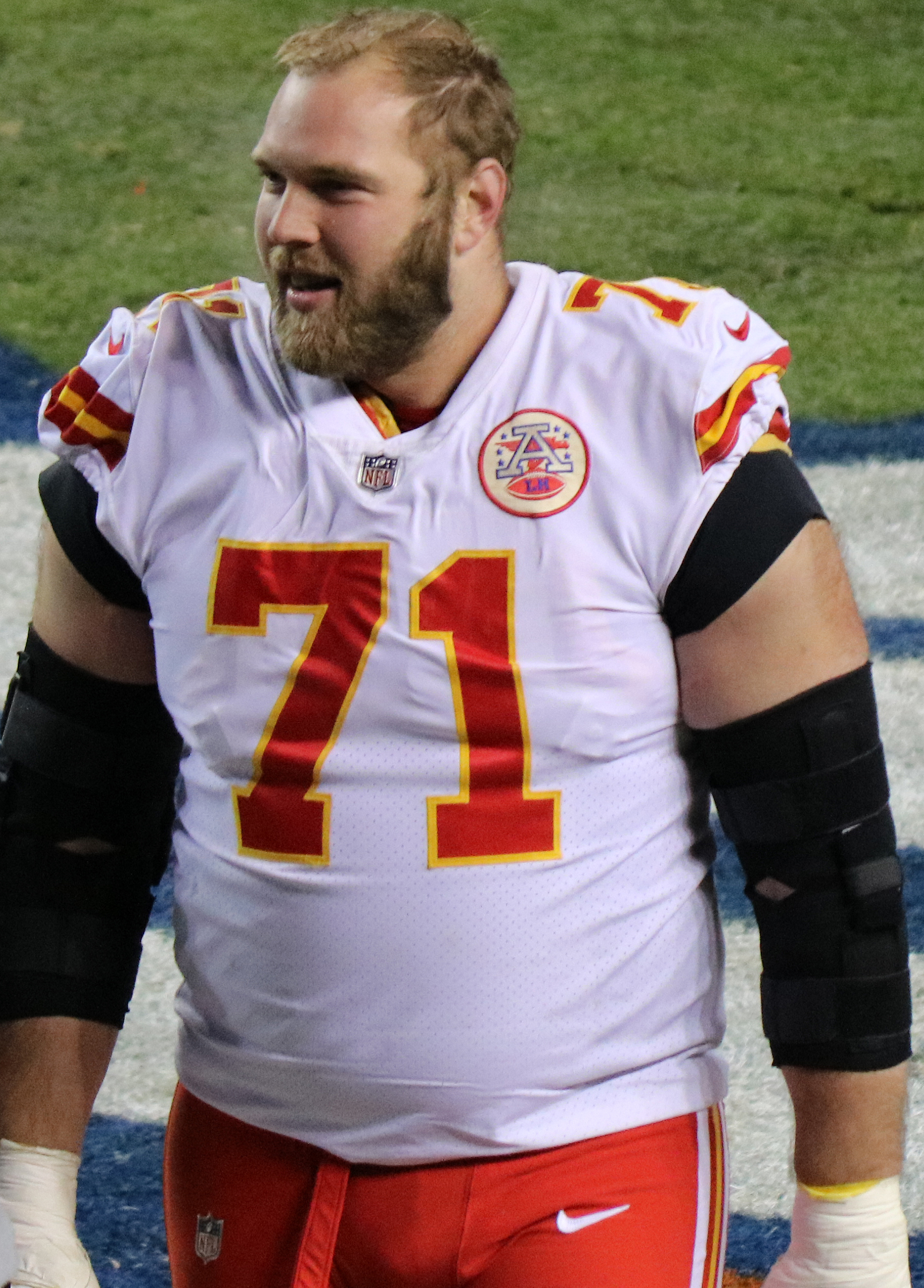
Mitchell Schwartz

- Sid Abramowitz, US, OT
- Erik Affholter, US, WR, set national field goal record
- Doc Alexander, US, G, 2× All-Pro
- Lyle Alzado, US, DE, 2× All-Pro
- Harris Barton, US, OT, 2× All-Pro
- Alan Bersin, US, defensive lineman, offensive guard, and linebacker, Harvard, First Team All-Ivy League, All-New England, and All-East
- David Binn, US, LS, All-Pro
- Arthur Bluethenthal, US, C
- Greg Camarillo, US, WR
- Noah Cantor, Canada, DT, 2x Canadian Football League All Star
- Gabe Carimi, US, OT, All-American and Outland Trophy
- **Jake Curhan**, US, OT
- Jordan Dangerfield, US, SS
- JT Daniels, US, QB, Gatorade Player of the Year
- Brian de la Puente, US, C
- **A. J. Dillon** (Quadzilla), US, RB (Carolina Panthers)
- Michael Dunn, US, G
- Nate Ebner, US, DB
- Brad Edelman, US, OG, 1× Pro Bowl
- Julian Edelman, US, WR, MVP in Super Bowl LIII
- Jay Fiedler, US, QB
- Anthony Firkser, US, TE
- John Frank, US, TE
- Benny Friedman, US, QB & halfback, 4× All-Pro, Pro Football Hall of Fame, College Football Hall of Fame
- Lennie Friedman, US, G
- Steve Furness, US, DL
- Antonio Garay, US, DT
- Sid Gillman, US, end and coach, Pro Football Hall of Fame, College Football Hall of Fame
- Adam Goldberg, US, OL
- Bill Goldberg, US, DT; professional wrestler (4× world champion)
- Marshall “Biggie” Goldberg, US, RB, All-Pro, College Football Hall of Fame
- Charles "Buckets" Goldenberg, US, G & RB, All-Pro
- Lou Gordon, US, OL
- Randy Grossman, US, TE
- Arnold Horween, US, halfback, fullback, center, and blocking back (quarterback), Harvard All-American, and NFL player
- Ralph Horween, US, fullback, halfback, punter, and drop-kicker, Harvard All-American and NFL player
- Greg Joseph, South African, kicker
- Sonny Karnofsky, US, HB
- Perry Klein, US, QB
- Kyle Kosier, US, OL
- Mort Landsberg, US, HB
- Len “Butch” Levy, US, G
- Erik Lorig, US, FB
- Sid Luckman, US, QB, 8× All-Pro, MVP, Pro Football Hall of Fame, College Football Hall of Fame
- Joe Magidsohn, Russia, Halfback
- Ali Marpet, US, G
- Taylor Mays, US, S
- Sam McCullum, US, WR
- Josh Miller, US, P
- Wayne Millner, US, E, DE, Pro Football Hall of Fame, College Football Hall of Fame
- Ron Mix, US, OT, 9× All-Pro, Pro Football Hall of Fame
- Ed Newman, US, G, All-Pro, College Football Hall of Fame, NFL passing yards and touchdowns leader
- Harry Newman, US, QB, All-Pro
- Brent Novoselsky, US, TE
- Igor Olshansky, Ukraine, DE
- Adam Podlesh, US, P
- Merv Pregulman, US, T & C, College Football Hall of Fame
- Jake Retzlaff, US, QB (Tulane Green Wave)
- Josh Rosen, US, QB
- Sage Rosenfels, US, QB
- Mike Rosenthal, US, T
- Sam Salz, US, receiver, Texas A & M; rare Orthodox Jewish player in Division 1 college football
- Adam Schreiber, US, C/LS
- Geoff Schwartz, US, OT
- Mitchell Schwartz, US, OT, All-Pro
- Mike Seidman, US, TE
- Allie Sherman, US, running back, QB & coach
- Steve Shull, US, LB
- Scott Slutzker, US, TE
- Ariel Solomon, US, OL
- Bob Stein, US, LB
- Paul “Twister” Steinberg, US, FB/HB
- Rich Stotter, US, LB
- Michael Stromberg, US, LB
- Terrell Suggs, US, DE, All-Pro, NFL Defensive Player of the Year
- Steve Tannen, US, CB
- Joseph Taussig, Germany-born US, QB
- Andre Tippett, US, LB, 2× All-Pro, NFL co-Defensive Player of the Year, Pro Football Hall of Fame, College Football Hall of Fame
- Alan Veingrad, US, OL
- Izzy Weinstock, US, FB
- Gary Wood, US, QB
- Sid Youngelman, US, OT
- Joe Zelikovitz, Canadian gridiron football player

== Association football (soccer) ==
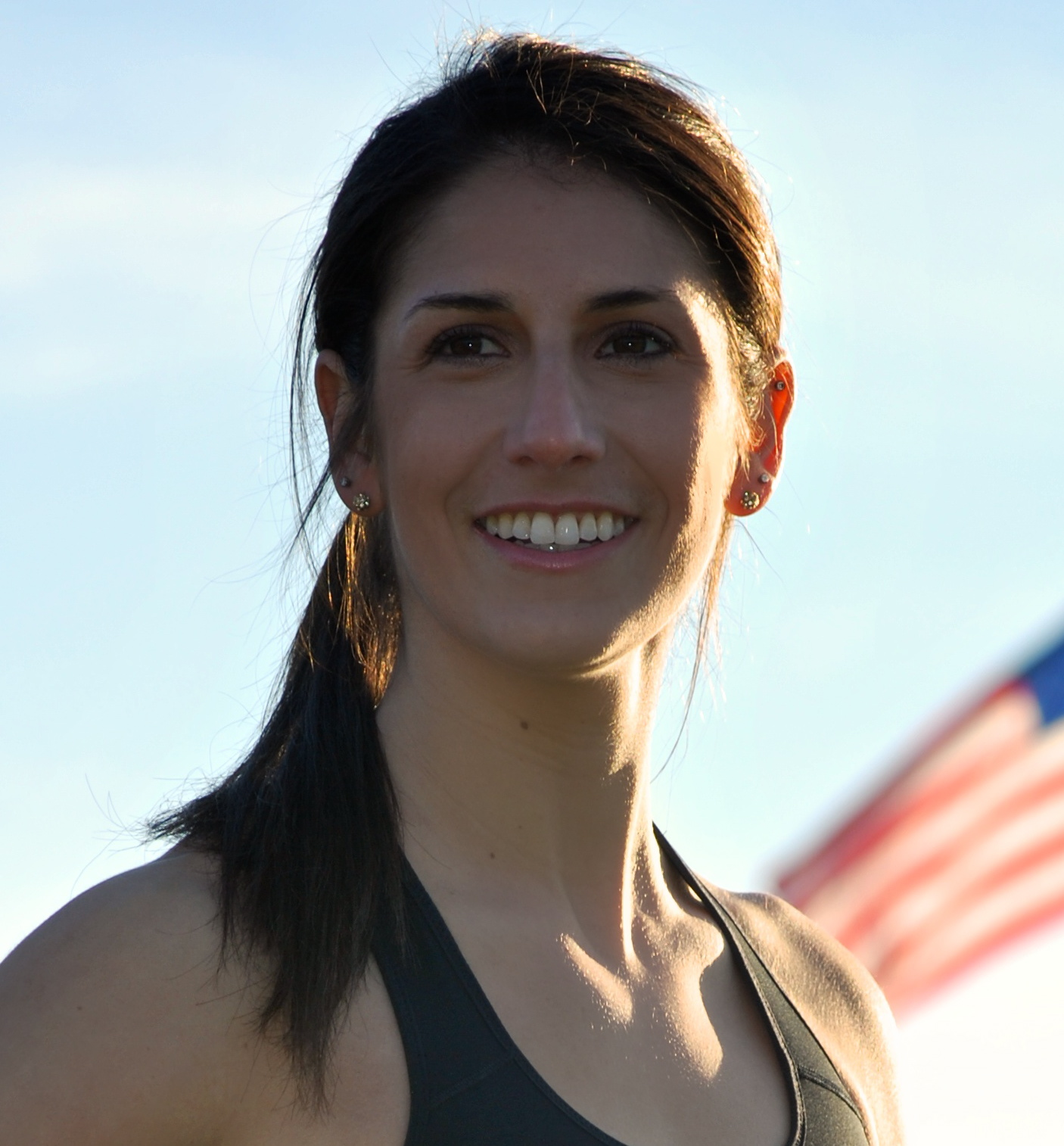
Yael Averbuch

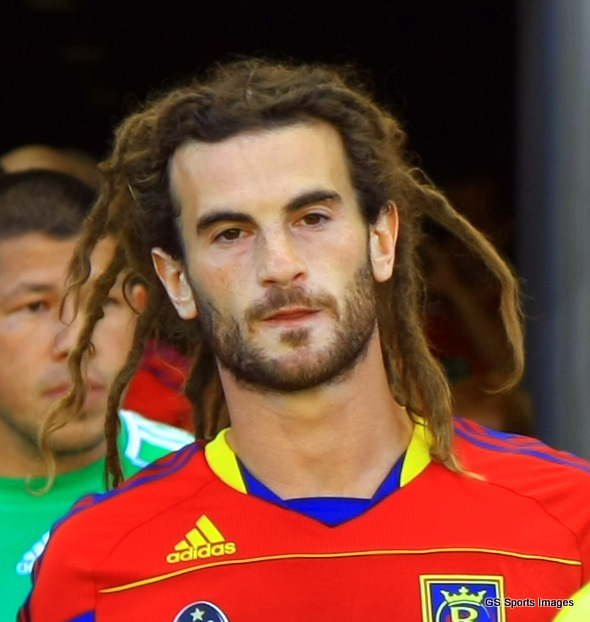
Kyle Beckerman

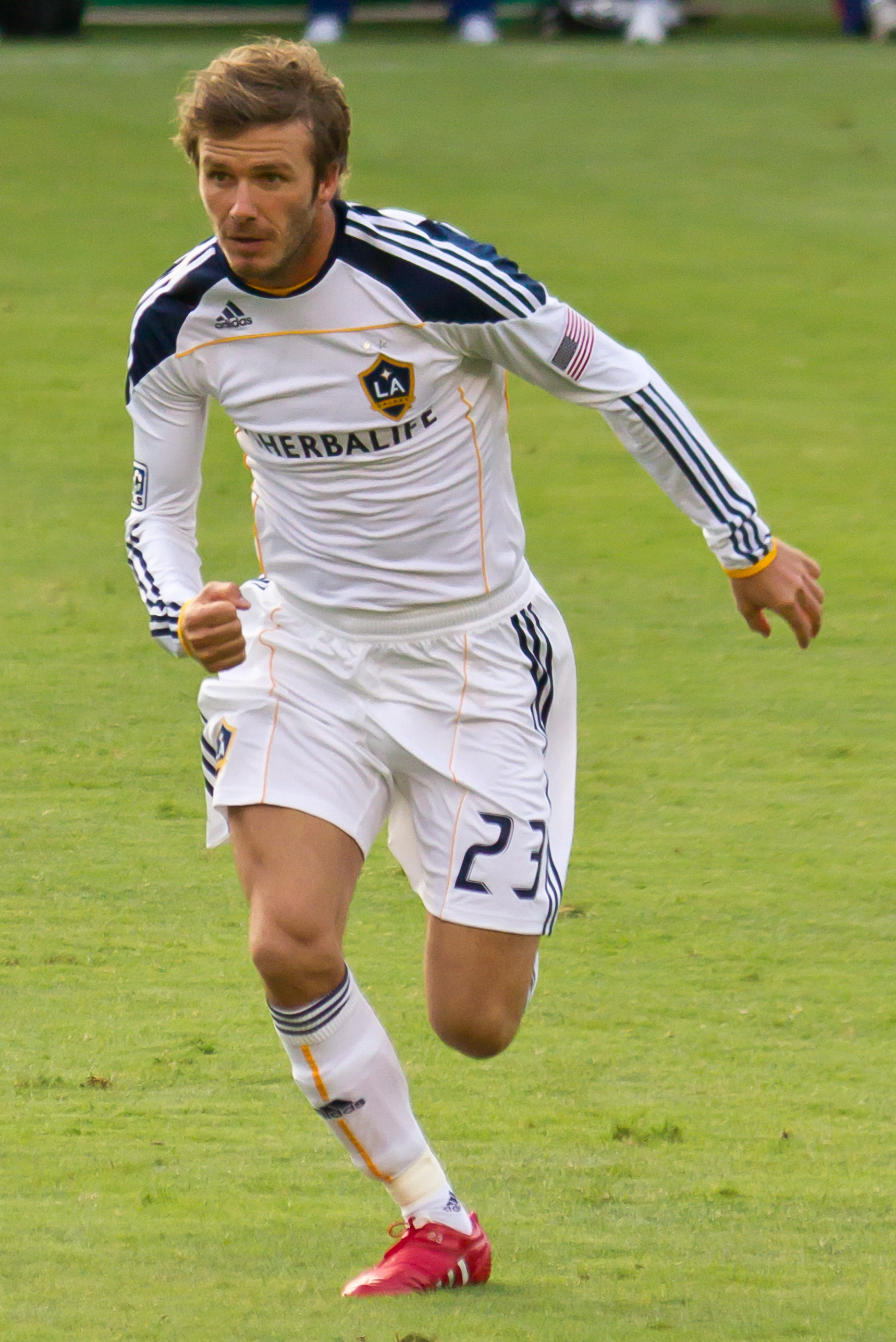
David Beckham

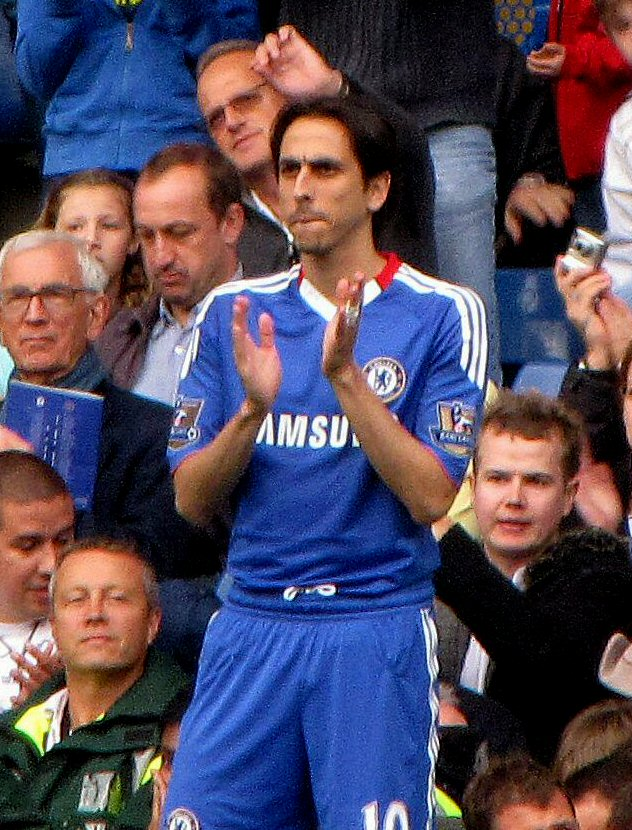
Yossi Benayoun

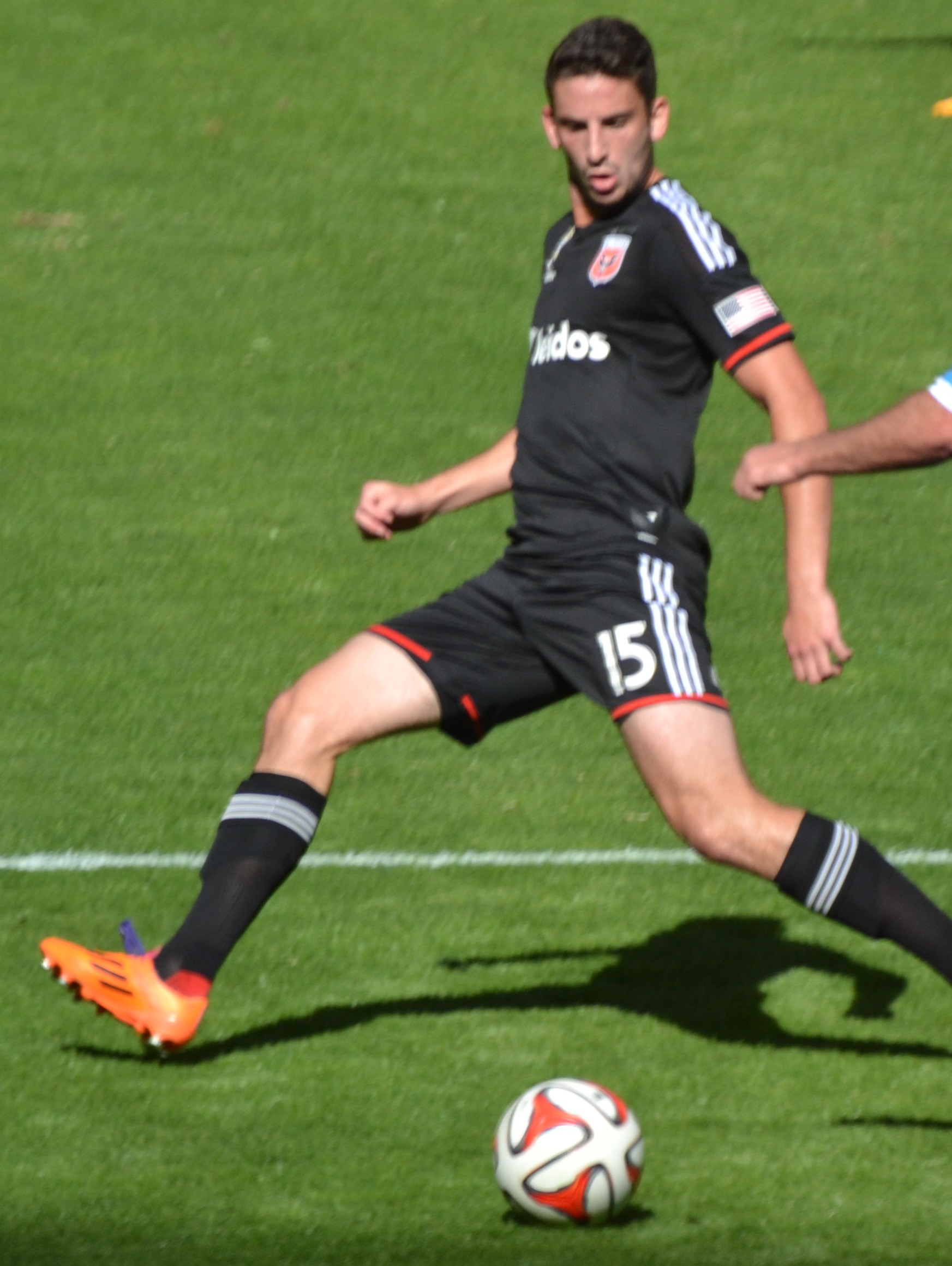
Steve Birnbaum

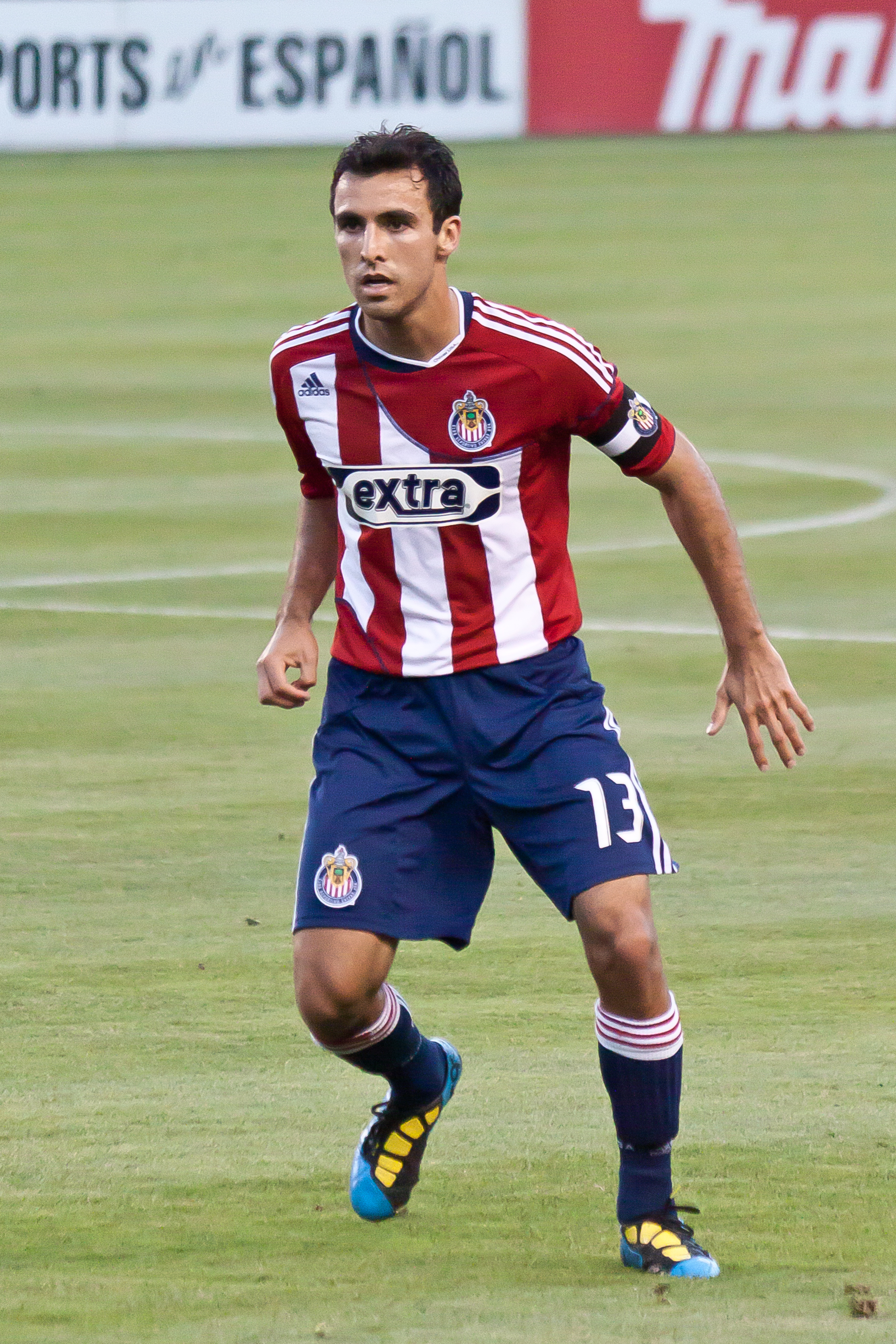
Jonathan Bornstein

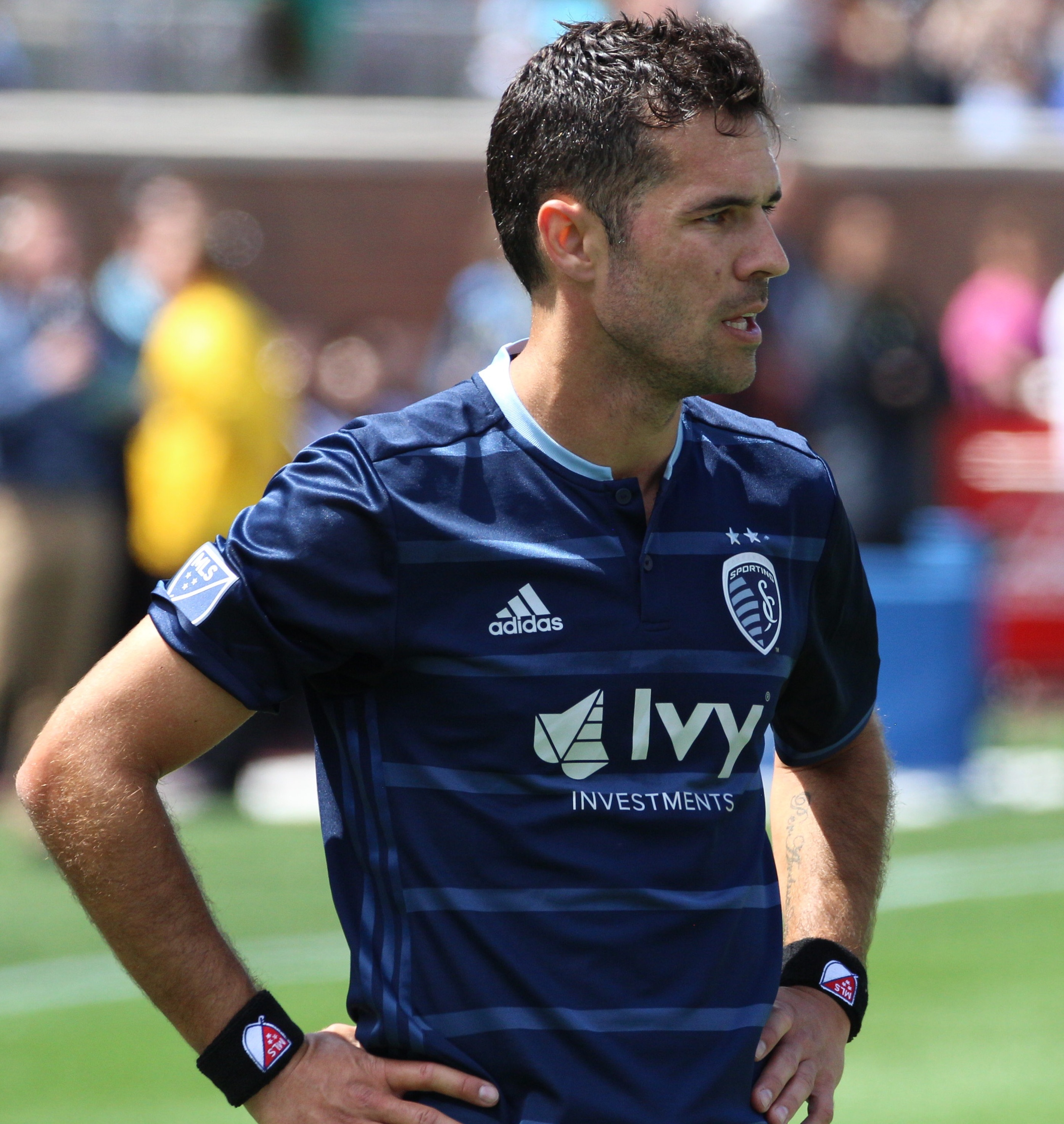
Benny Feilhaber

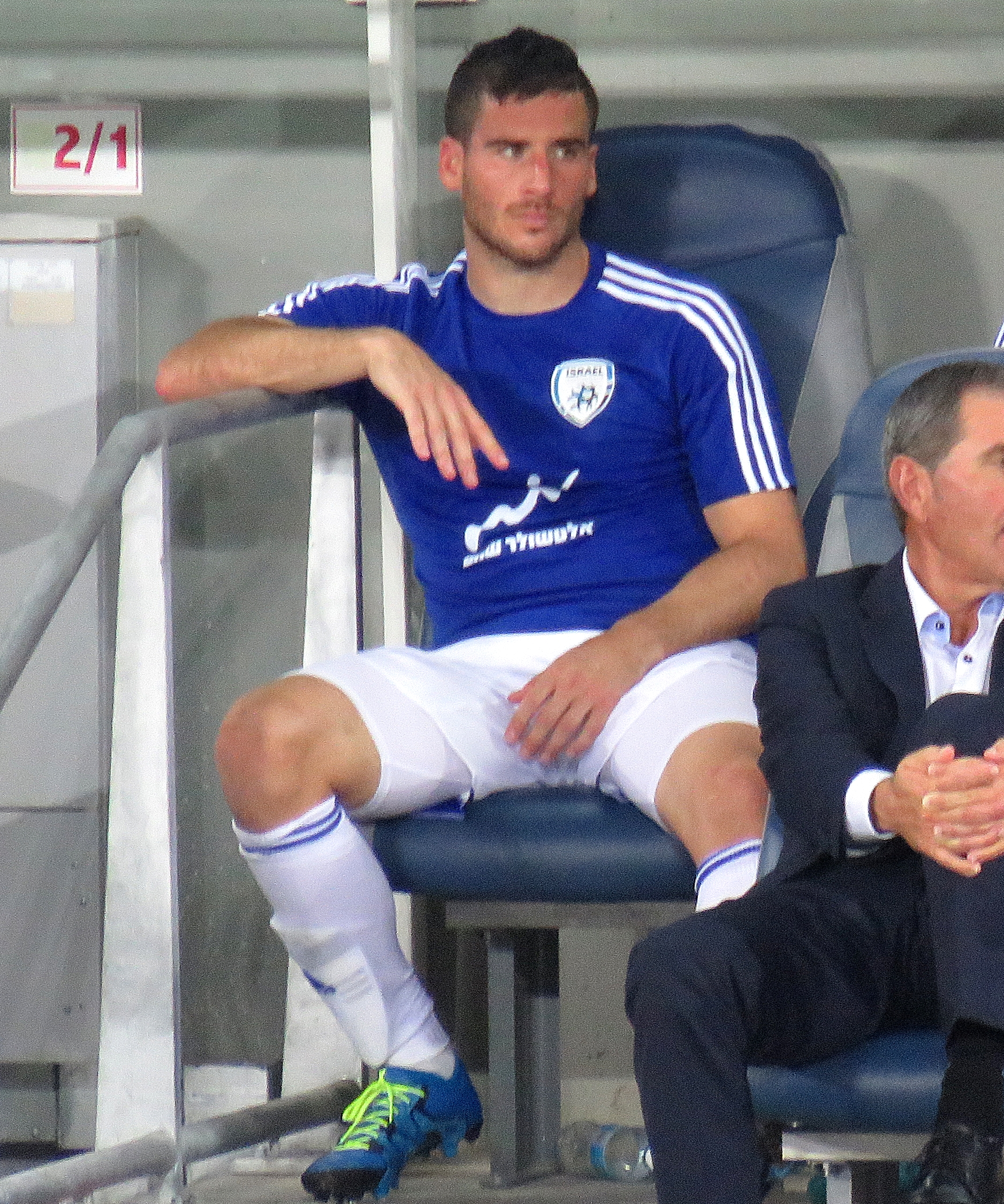
Tomer Hemed

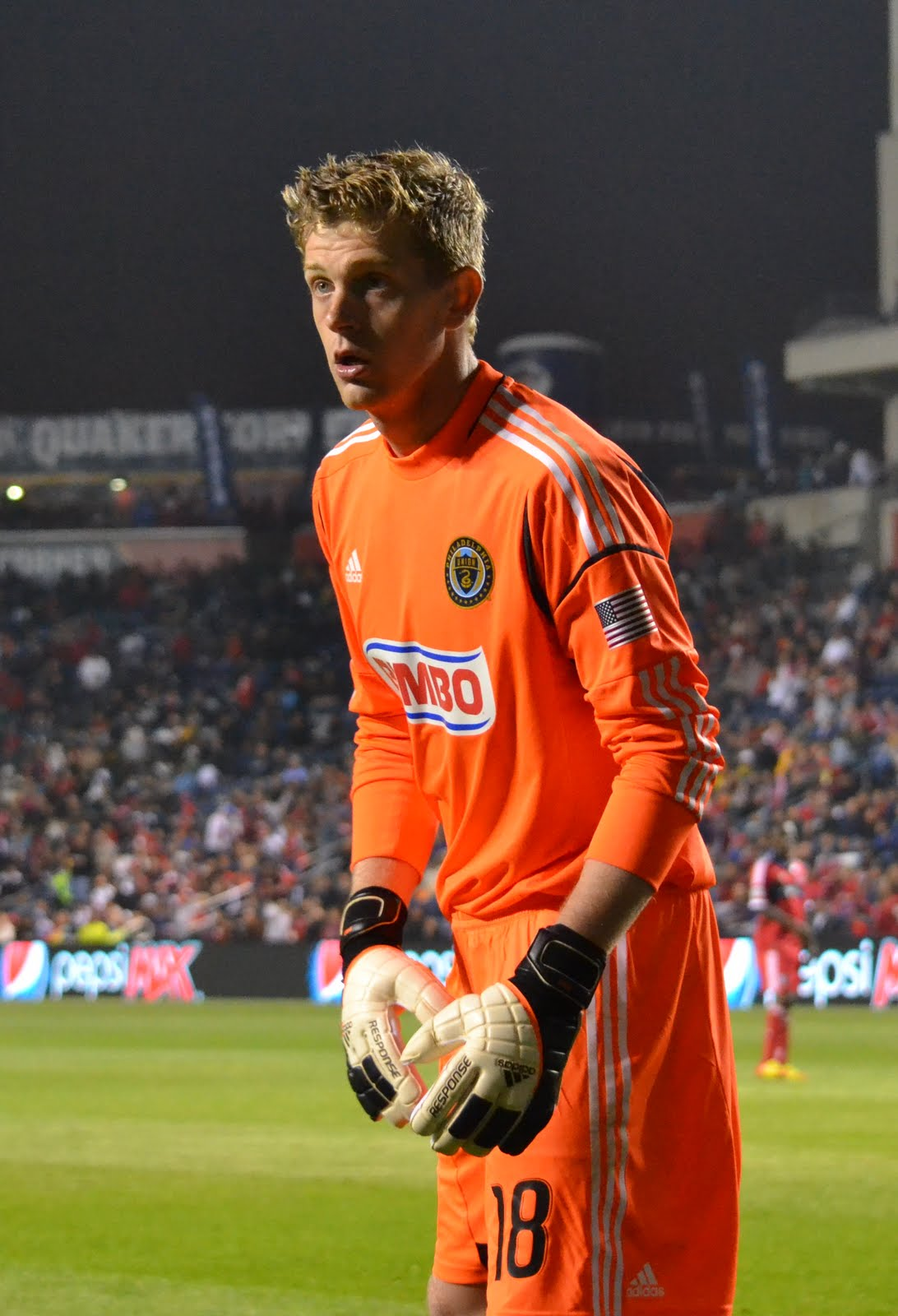
Zac MacMath

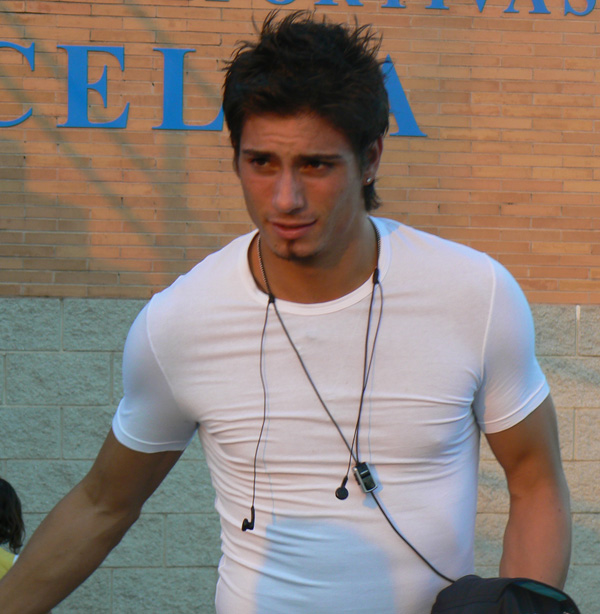
Daniël de Ridder

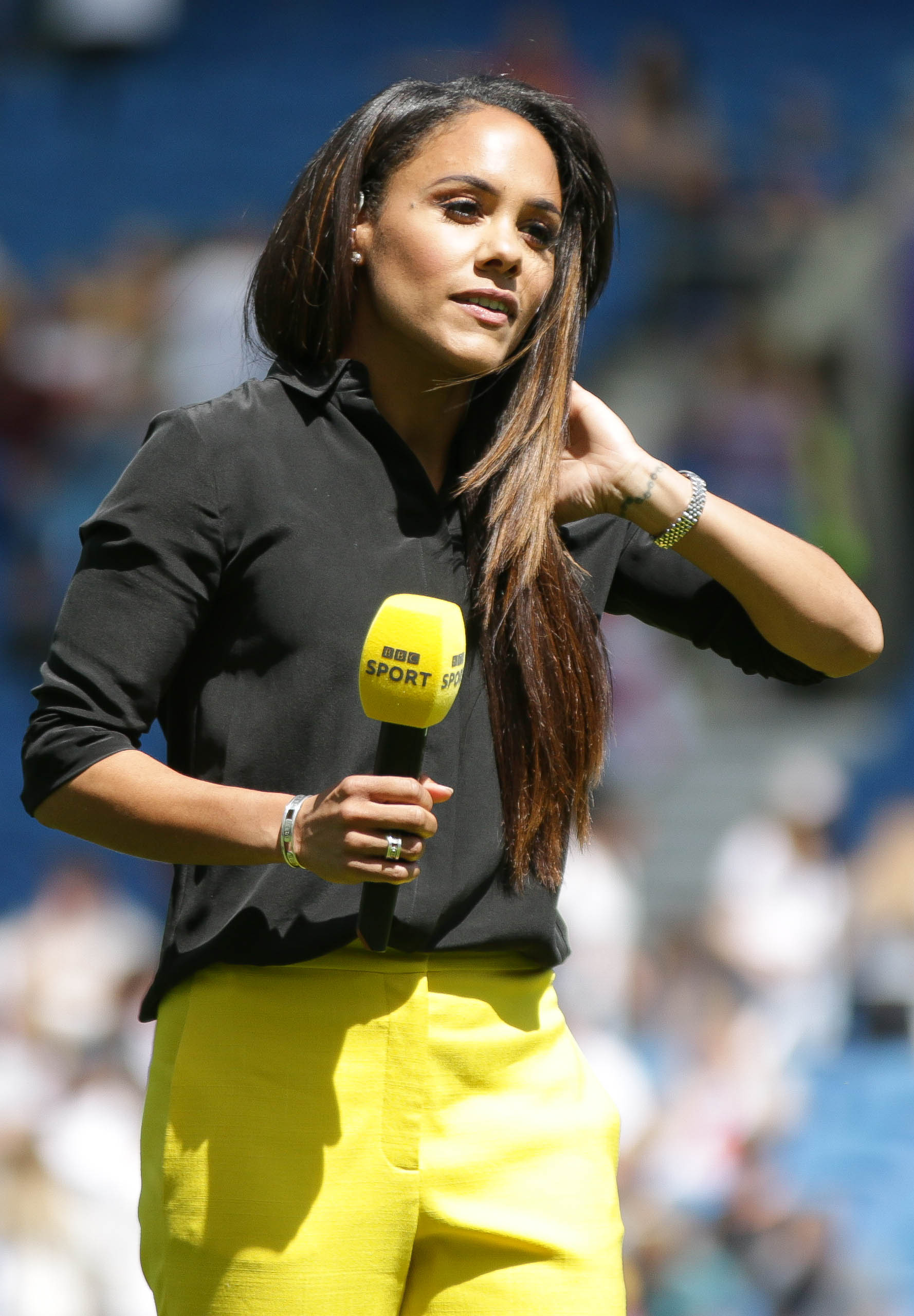
Alex Scott

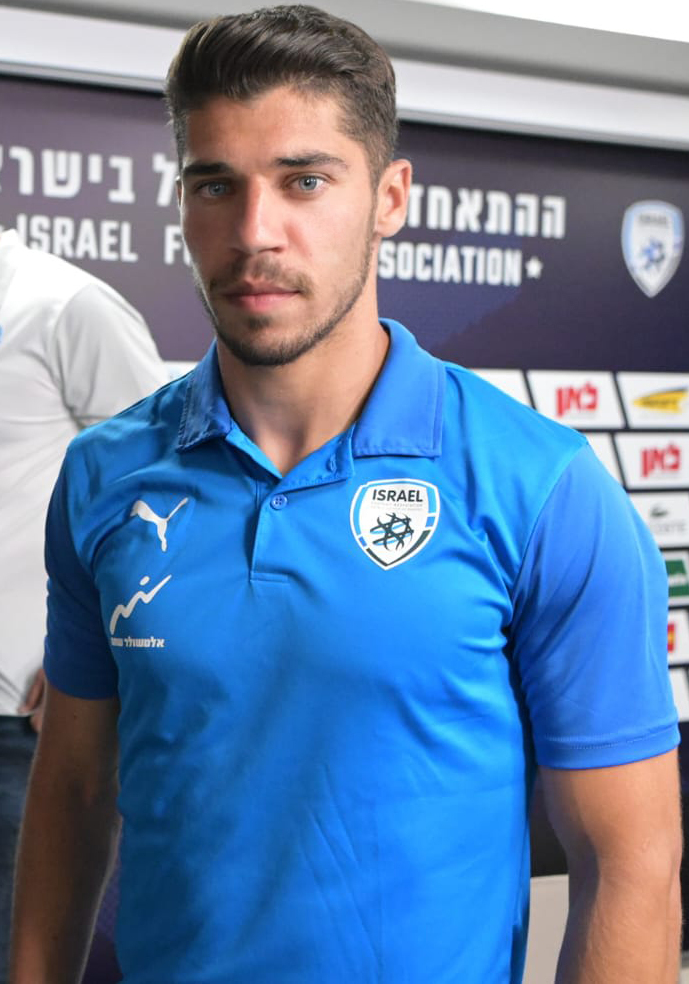
Manor Solomon

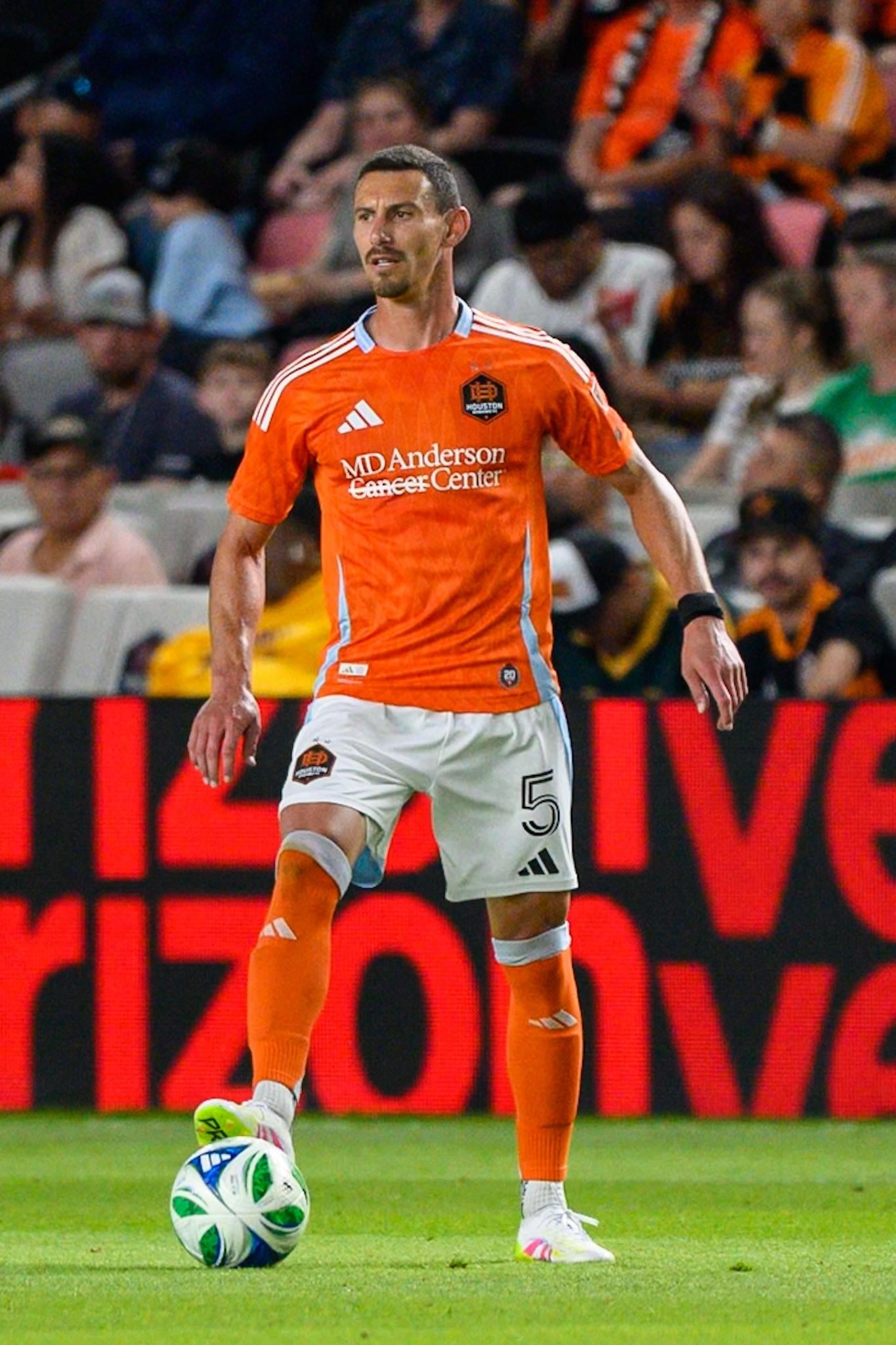
Daniel Steres

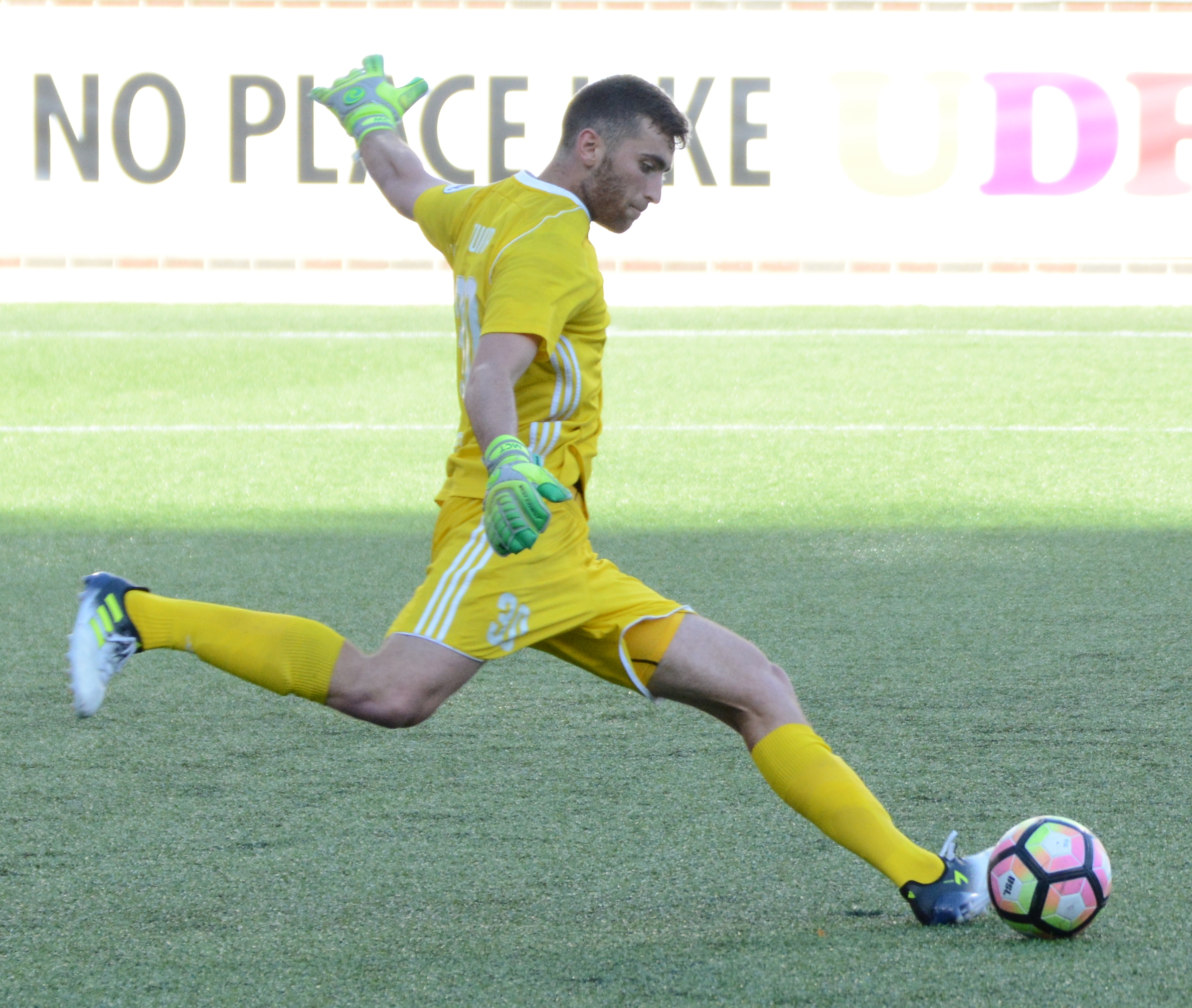
Matt Turner

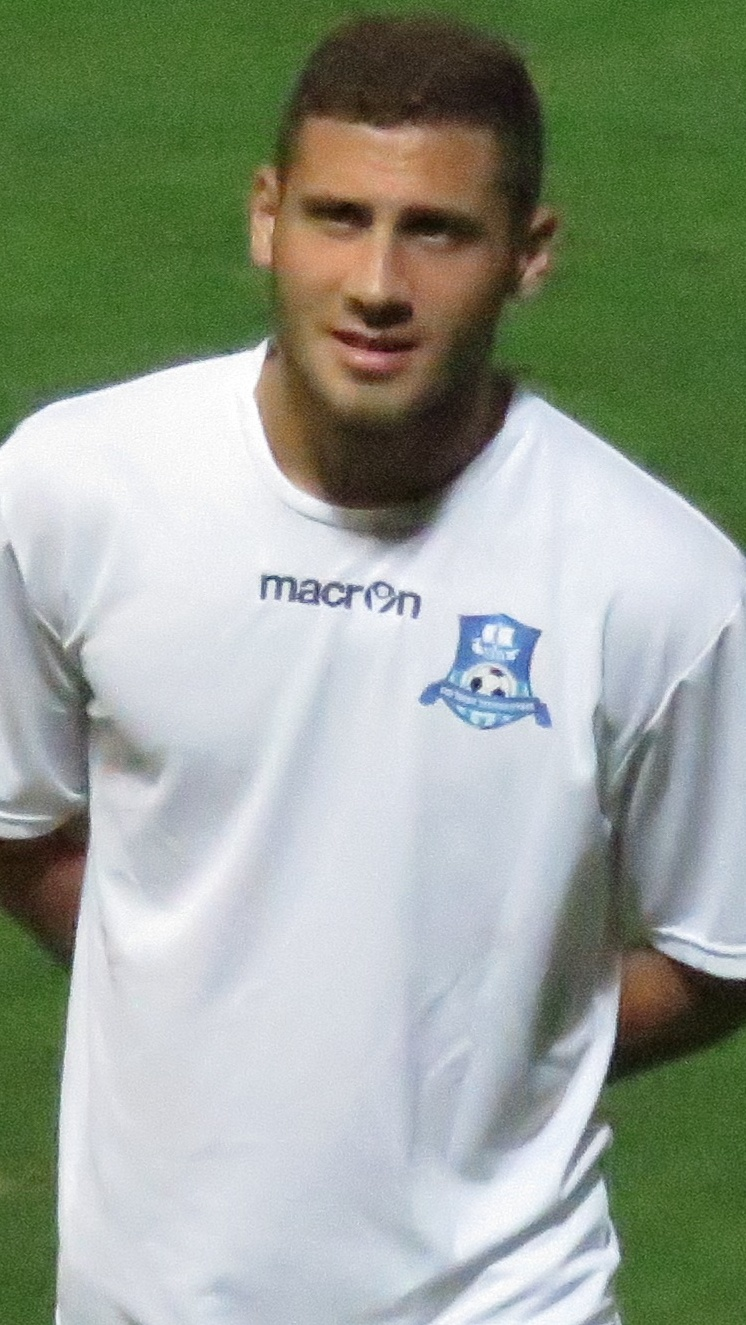
Shon Weissman

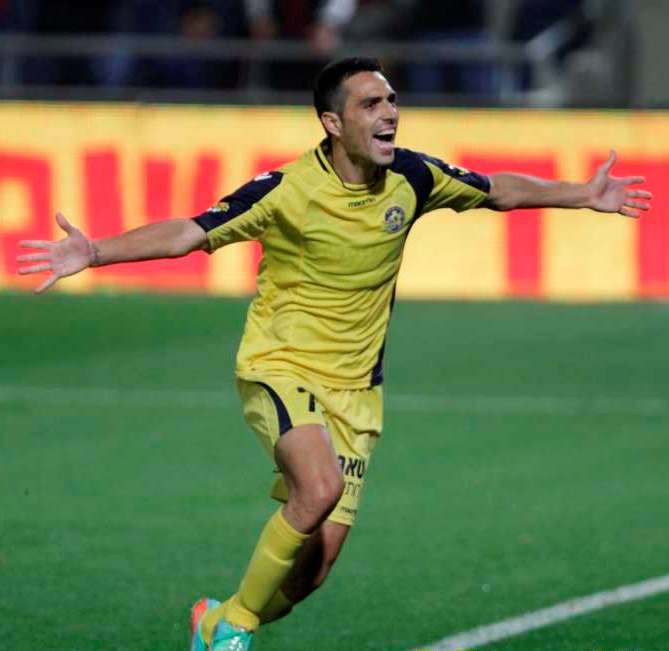
Eran Zahavi

- **Liel Abada**, Israel, forward (Charlotte & national team)
- **Ryan Adeleye**, US/Israel, defender (Atlantic City FC)
- Jeff Agoos, US, defender (national team)
- Yari Allnut, US, midfielder (national team)
- Hennadiy Altman, Ukraine, goalkeeper
- Kyle Altman, US, defender
- Dudu Aouate, Israel, goalkeeper (RCD Mallorca & national team)
- **Gary Assous**, France/Israel, midfielder (Hapoel Katamon Jerusalem F.C.)
- Jonathan Assous, France/Israel, defensive midfielder
- Gai Assulin, Israel, winger/attacking midfielder
- Yael Averbuch, US National Team, midfielder
- Finn Azaz, Ireland national team and Middlesbrough
- Pini Balili, Israel, striker (Maccabi Ironi Bat Yam & national team)
- Tal Banin, Israel, midfielder, national team, manager
- **Tai Baribo**, Israel, forward (D.C. United & national team)
- Orr Barouch, Israel, striker
- Kyle Beckerman, US, midfielder (Real Salt Lake & national team)
- David Beckham, UK, midfielder, English Football Hall of Fame, Premier League Hall of Fame (England national team)
- David "Dedi" Ben Dayan, Israel, left defender (Maccabi Petah Tikva & national team)
- Tal Ben Haim, Israel, center back/right back (Beitar Jerusalem & national team)
- Arik Benado, Israel, defender (national team)
- Yossi Benayoun, Israel, attacking midfielder
- Eyal Berkovic, Israel, midfielder (national team)
- Rhett Bernstein, US, defender (Miami FC)
- Steve Birnbaum, US, defender (D.C. United & national team)
- Gyula Bíró, Hungary, midfielder/forward (national team)
- **Nir Bitton**, Israel, defender/midfielder (Ashdod & national team)
- **Nick Blackman**, England/Barbados/Israel, striker (Maccabi Tel Aviv & Barbados national team)
- Jean Bloch, France, Olympic silver
- Harald Bohr, Denmark, Olympic silver
- **Noam Bonnet**, France, midfielder (Hapeol Acre)
- Louis Bookman, Lithuanian-born Ireland, forward
- **Jonathan Bornstein**, US/Israel, left back/midfielder (Chicago Fire & U.S. national team)
- David Boysen, Denmark/Israel, left winger
- Daniel Brailovski, Argentina/Uruguay, midfielder (Argentina, Mexico, Uruguay, & Israel national teams)
- Adam Braz, Canada, defender
- Ashley Brown, Australia, football (soccer) player Melbourne Victory
- **Jordan Brown**, Australia, midfielder (Melbourne Victory)
- Tomer Chencinski, Israel/Canada, goalkeeper (Shamrock Rovers & national team)
- Jordan Cila, US, forward (Under-17 World Cup)
- Avi Cohen, Israel, defender (Liverpool, Rangers, Maccabi Tel Aviv & national team)
- Martin Cohen, South Africa, midfielder (Highlands Park, LA Aztecs, California Surf, Wits University & national team)
- Steven Cohen, France-Israel, midfielder
- Tamir Cohen, Israel, midfielder (national team)
- **Yonatan Cohen**, Israel, attacking midfielder/forward (Maccabi Tel Aviv & national team)
- Edgar Davids, Netherlands, midfielder (Ajax Amsterdam, Juventus, and national team)
- Rolf Decker, Germany-born US, midfielder (US national team)
- Micky Dulin, England (Tottenham)
- **Daniel Edelman**, US, midfielder (New York Red Bulls)
- **Yaniv Edery**, France/Morocco, defender (F.C. Jerusalem)
- Yakov Ehrlich, Russia, striker (FC Ocean Kerch)
- Sol Eisner, US, forward (New York Americans and USMNT)
- **Ilay Elmkies**, Israel, midfielder (Ironi Tiberias & national team)
- Ernő Egri Erbstein, Hungary, midfielder
- Benny Feilhaber, Brazil/US, center/attacking midfielder (Sporting Kansas City & U.S. national team)
- **Ilay Feingold**, Israel, right-back/centre-back (New England Revolution & national team)
- Lajos Fischer, Hungary, goalkeeper, national team player
- Otto Fischer, Austria, national team player and coach
- Gottfried Fuchs, Germany/Canada (Germany national team)
- **Dean Furman**, South Africa, midfielder (Warrington Rylands 1906 & national team)
- Peter Fuzes, Australia, goalkeeper
- Sándor Geller, Hungary, goalkeeper, Olympic champion
- Mikhail Gershkovich, URS, forward, Europe U-19 Champion (national team)
- Ludwik Gintel, Poland, defender and forward (national team)
- **Jake Girdwood-Reich**, Australia, defensive midfielder/central defender (St. Louis City SC)
- Jordan Gruber, US, striker
- Andy Gruenebaum, US, goalkeeper
- Béla Guttmann, Hungary, midfielder, national team player & international coach
- Rudy Haddad, France/Israel, midfielder
- Eddy Hamel, US, right winger (AFC Ajax; killed by the Nazis in Auschwitz)
- **Tomer Hemed**, Israel, forward (Maccabi Haifa & national team)
- Julius Hirsch, Germany, winger (Karlsruher FV; killed by the Nazis)
- Ya'akov Hodorov, Israel, goalkeeper (national team)
- Rinus Israel, Netherlands, defender (Feyenoord and national team)
- **Joe Jacobson**, Wales, left back (Wycombe Wanderers & U21 national team)
- Tvrtko Kale, Croatia/Israel, goalkeeper
- Viktor Kanevskyi, URS, striker & manager
- Tal Karp, Australia, midfielder (Melbourne Victory)
- **Scott Kashket**, England, striker (Welling United)
- Yaniv Katan, Israel, forward/winger (Maccabi Haifa & national team)
- **Josh Kennet**, England/Israel, midfielder/right back (London Lions)
- Gyula Kertész, Hungary, winger, player & manager
- Vilmos Kertész, Hungary, winger, 47 national team caps
- Józef Klotz, Poland, national team; killed by the Nazis
- Konstantin Krizhevsky, URS/Russia, defender (national team)
- Mark Lazarus, England, right winger
- **Jonathan Levin**, Mexico, midfielder (Venados)
- **Lucas Matías Licht**, Argentina, left defender/left winger (Villa San Carlos)
- Marcelo Lipatin, Uruguay, forward (C.D. Trofense)
- Józef Lustgarten, Poland (17 years in the Gulag)
- **Zac MacMath**, US, goalkeeper (Real Salt Lake)
- Mickaël Madar, France, striker
- Melissa Maizels, Australia, goalkeeper (Melbourne Victory FC (W-League))
- Gyula Mándi, Hungary, half back (player & coach of Hungarian and Israeli national teams)
- **Ofir Marciano**, Israel, goalkeeper (Hapoel Be'er Sheva & national team)
- Shep Messing, US, goalkeeper (national team), manager, and sportscaster
- **Federico Mociulsky**, Argentina, midfielder (Deportivo Roca)
- Bennie Muller, Netherlands, midfielder (Ajax Amsterdam & national team)
- Andriy Oberemko, Ukraine, midfielder (U21 national team)
- Eli Ohana, Israel, won UEFA Cup Winners' Cup and Bravo Award (most outstanding young player in Europe); national team; manager
- Sid O'Linn, South Africa and Charlton Athletic
- Árpád Orbán, Hungary, Olympic champion
- Kevin Parienté, France, striker
- José Pékerman, Argentina, midfielder, former player, current coach and manager
- **Dor Peretz**, Israel, defensive midfielder (Maccabi Tel Aviv & national team)
- Zach Pfeffer, US, midfielder (Philadelphia Union)
- **Suf Podgoreanu**, Israel, forward (Spezia Calcio & Maccabi Haifa & national team)
- Roni Porokara, Finland, winger (national team)
- Boris Razinsky, URS/Russia, goalkeeper/striker, Olympic champion, manager
- Charlie Reiter, US, forward (Pali Blues)
- Haim Revivo, Israel, attacking/side midfielder (national team)
- Daniël de Ridder, Netherlands, forward winger/attacking midfielder (SC Cambuur & U21 national team)
- Johnny Roeg, Netherlands, striker
- Moshe Romano, Israel, striker (national team)
- Ronnie Rosenthal, Israel, left winger/striker (national team)
- Sebastián Rozental, Chile, forward (national team)
- Patricio Sayegh, Argentina, striker
- David Schipper, US, midfielder/fullback (Southern United)
- Aaron Schoenfeld, US/Israel, forward (Austin & Israel national team)
- **Ronnie Schwartz**, Denmark, striker (Hobro IK)
- Alex Scott (footballer, born 1984), England, right-back, 140 caps (England), 5 caps (Great Britain)
- **Jordan Sebban**, France, midfielder (F.C. Ashdod)
- Béla Sebestyén, Hungary, winger (national team)
- Barry Silkman, England, midfielder (QPR/Man City)
- **Manor Solomon**, Israel, winger/attacking midfielder (Tottenham Hotspur F.C. & national team)
- Juan Pablo Sorín, Argentina, defender (national team)
- Jonathan Spector, US, defender (Orlando City SC & national team)
- Leon Sperling, Poland, left wing (national team; killed by the Nazis in the Lemberg Ghetto)
- Giora Spiegel, Israel, midfielder (national team)
- Mordechai Spiegler, URS/Israel, striker (Israel national team), manager
- **Daniel Steres**, US, defender (Houston Dynamo)
- Sjaak Swart, Netherlands, winger (Ajax)
- Jordan Swibel, Australia, forward
- Idan Tal, Israel, midfielder (Beitar Jerusalem & national team)
- Nicolás Tauber, Argentina/Israel, goalkeeper (Villa San Carlos)
- **Dor Turgeman**, Israel, forward (New England Revolution & national team)
- **Matt Turner**, US, goalkeeper (New England Revolution & national team)
- **Joris van Overeem**, Netherlands/Israel, midfielder (Maccabi Tel Aviv)
- Yochanan Vollach, Israel, defender (national team)
- **Shon Weissman**, Israel, forward (Real Valladolid/Granada CF & national team)
- Sara Whalen, US, defender/forward, Olympic silver
- **DeAndre Yedlin**, US, defender/midfielder (Real Salt Lake & national team)
- **Eran Zahavi**, Israel, forward (Maccabi Tel Aviv & national team)

== Australian rules football ==
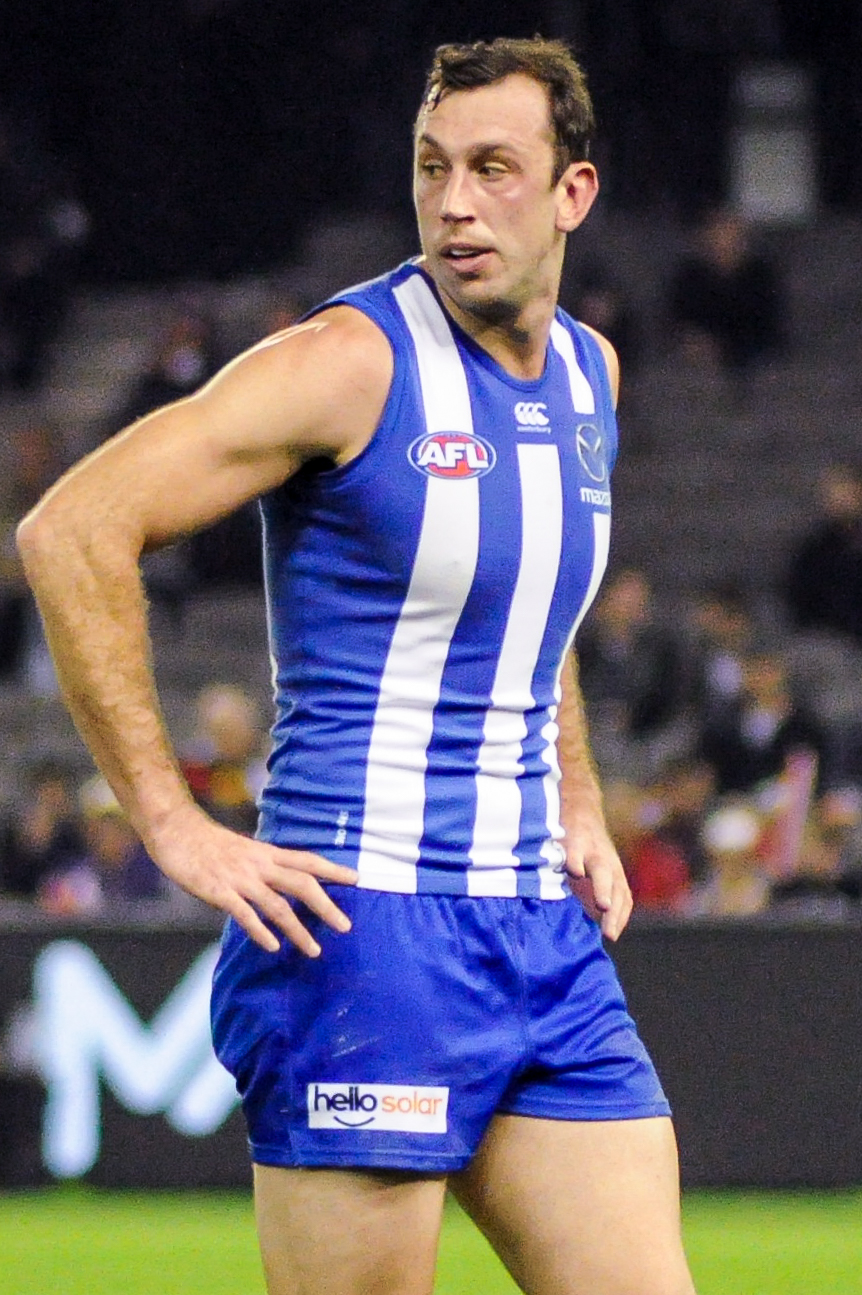
Todd Goldstein

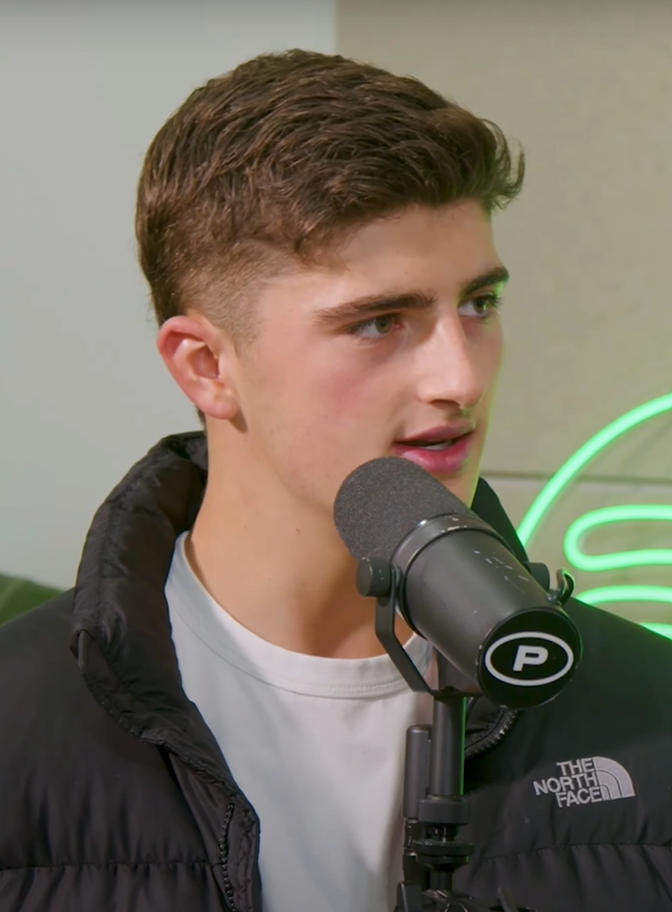
Harry Sheezel

- Keith Baskin, AFL footballer
- Mordy Bromberg, Australia, AFL footballer
- **Todd Goldstein**, AFL footballer (Essendon Football Club)
- Alby Herman, VFL footballer
- Chris Judd, AFL footballer
- Julian Kirzner, AFL footballer
- Trevor Korn, VFL footballer
- Barney Lazarus
- Ezra Poyas, AFL and VFL footballer
- Bert Rapiport
- **Harry Sheezel**, AFL footballer
- Ian Synman, AFL footballer, only Jew to play in a premiership
- Michael Zemski, Australia, AFL footballer

== Baseball ==
Harrison Bader, center fielder (San Francisco Giants)

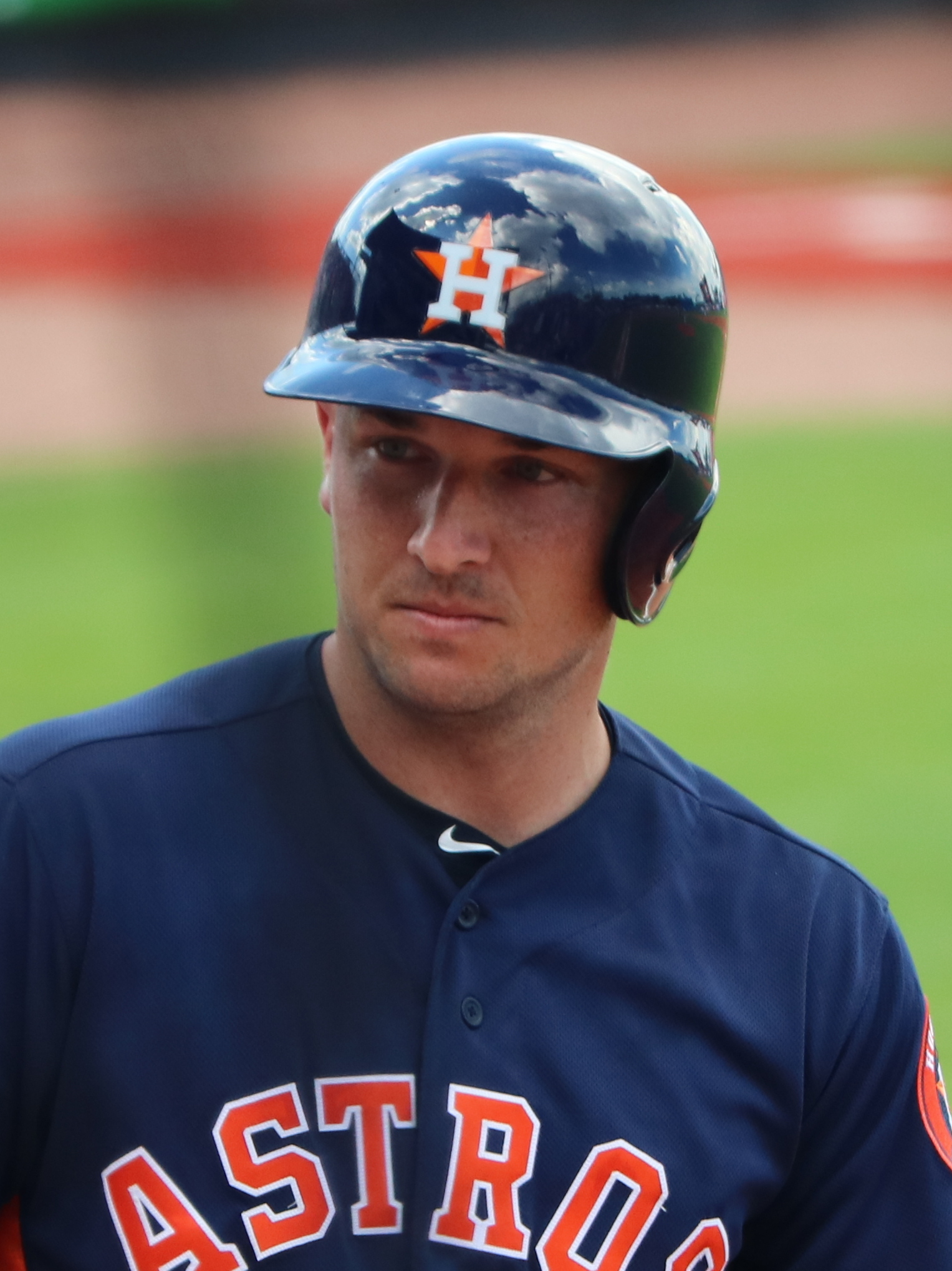
Alex Bregman, infielder (Chicago Cubs)

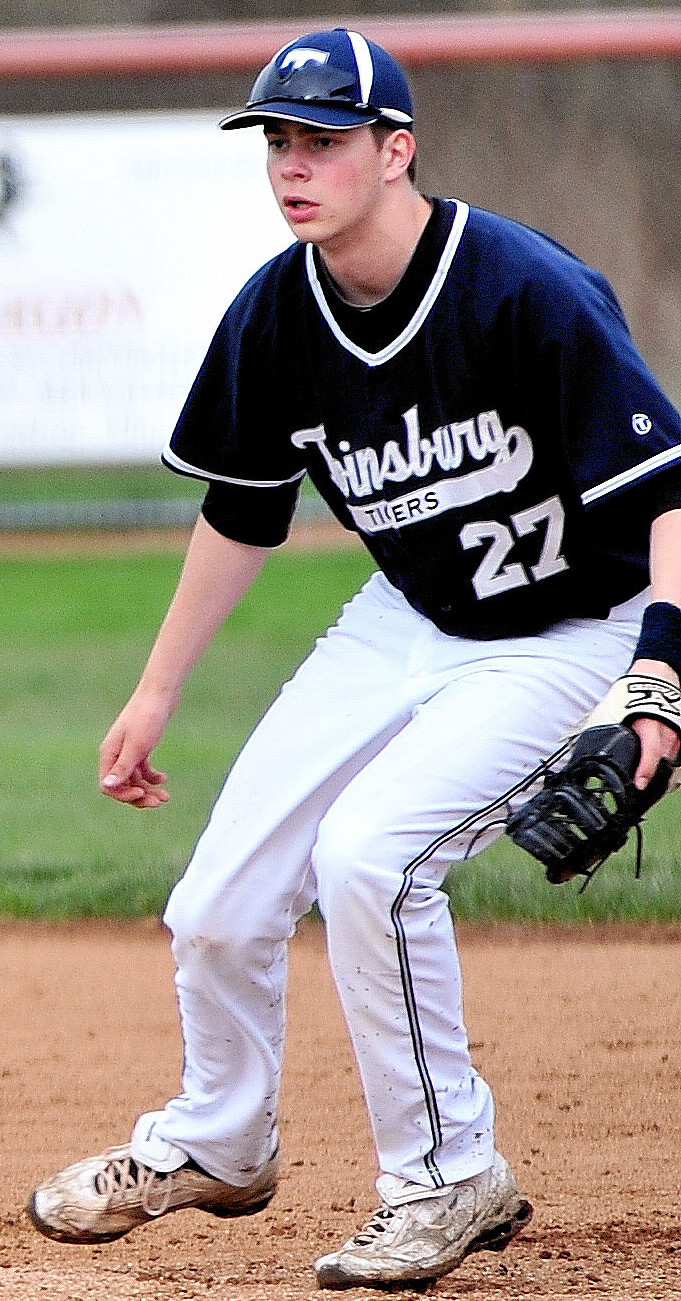
Scott Effross, pitcher (New York Yankees)

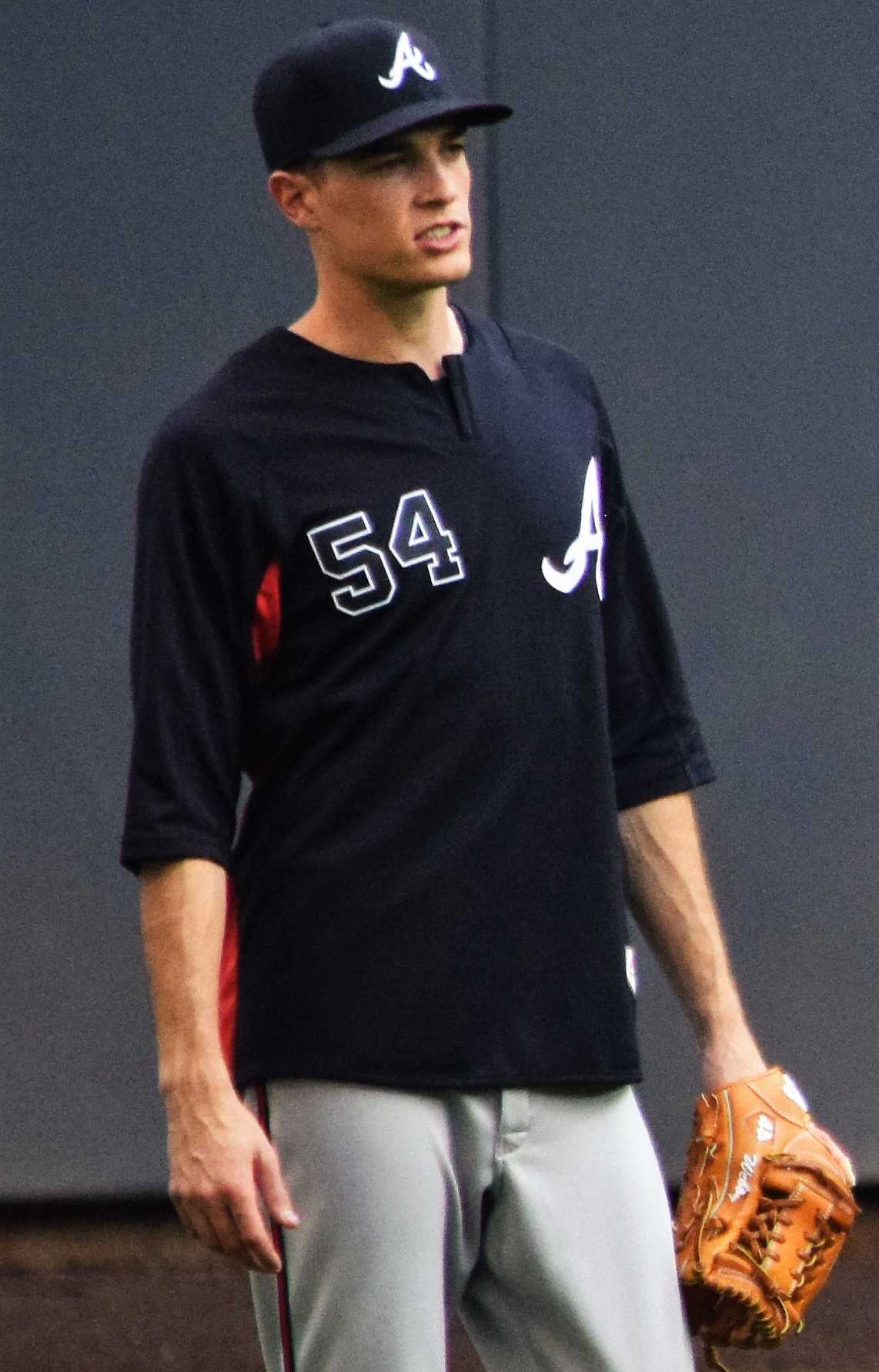
Max Fried, pitcher (New York Yankees)

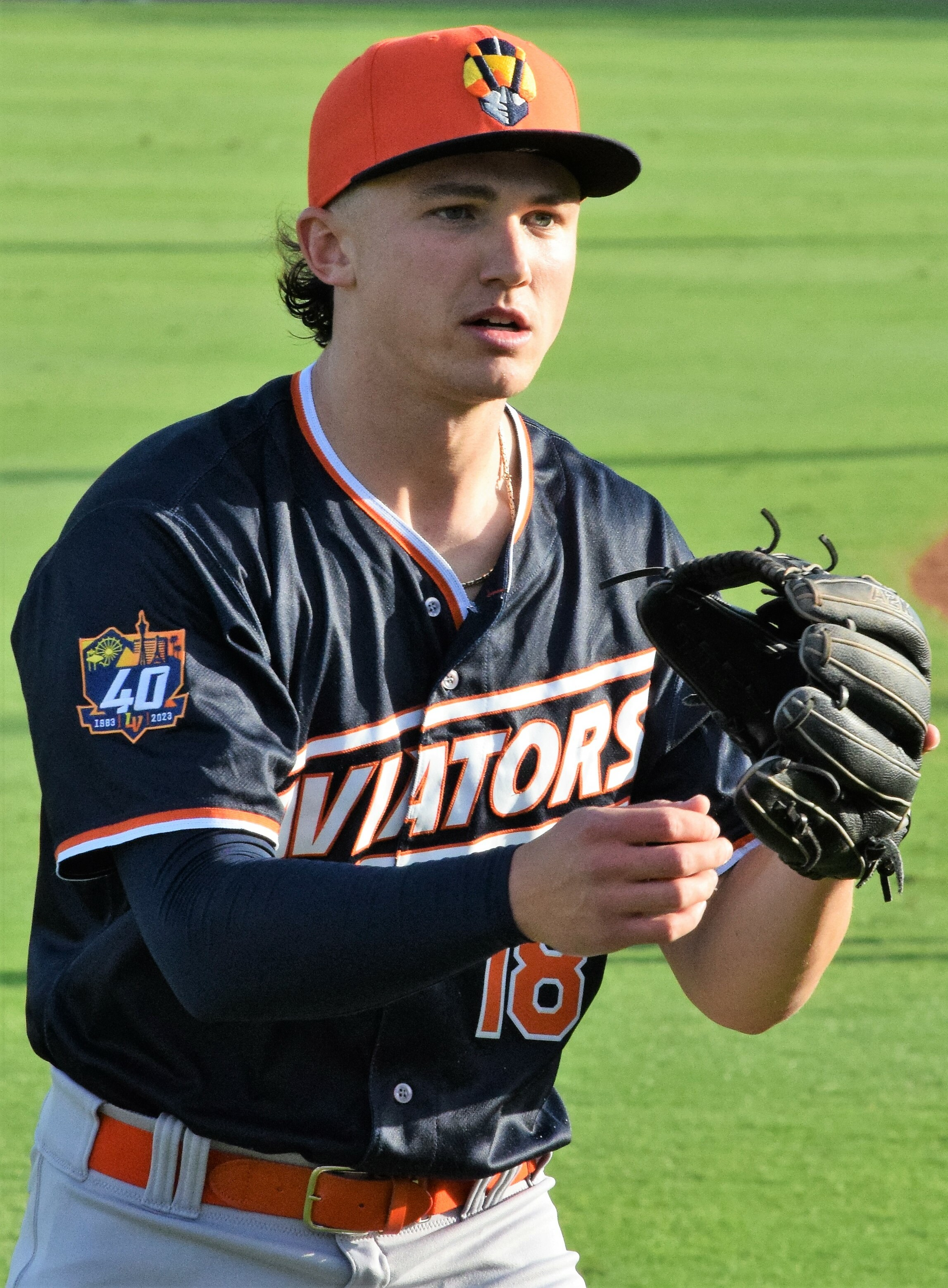
Zack Gelof, second baseman (Oakland Athletics; Team Israel)

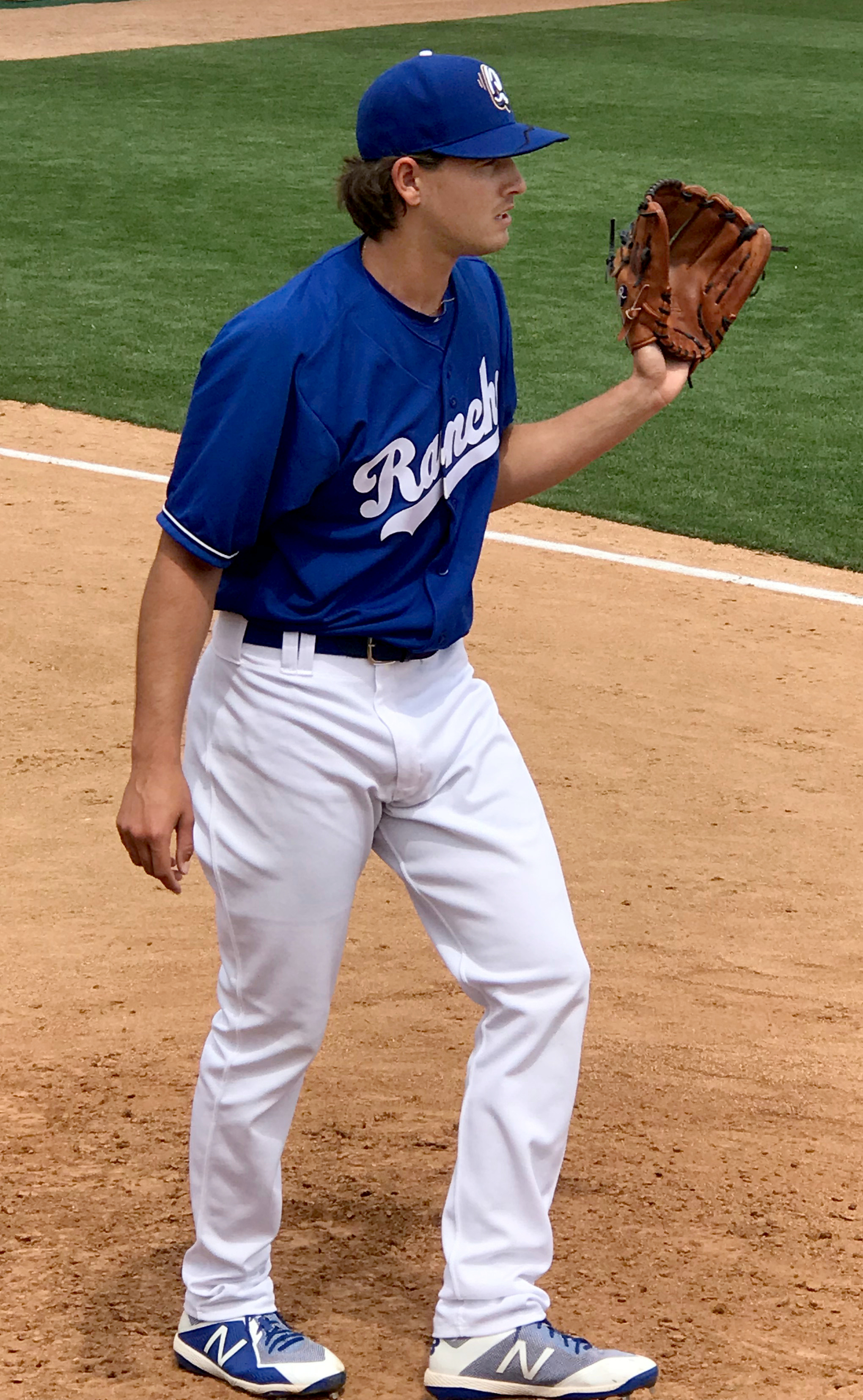
Dean Kremer, pitcher (Baltimore Orioles; Team Israel)

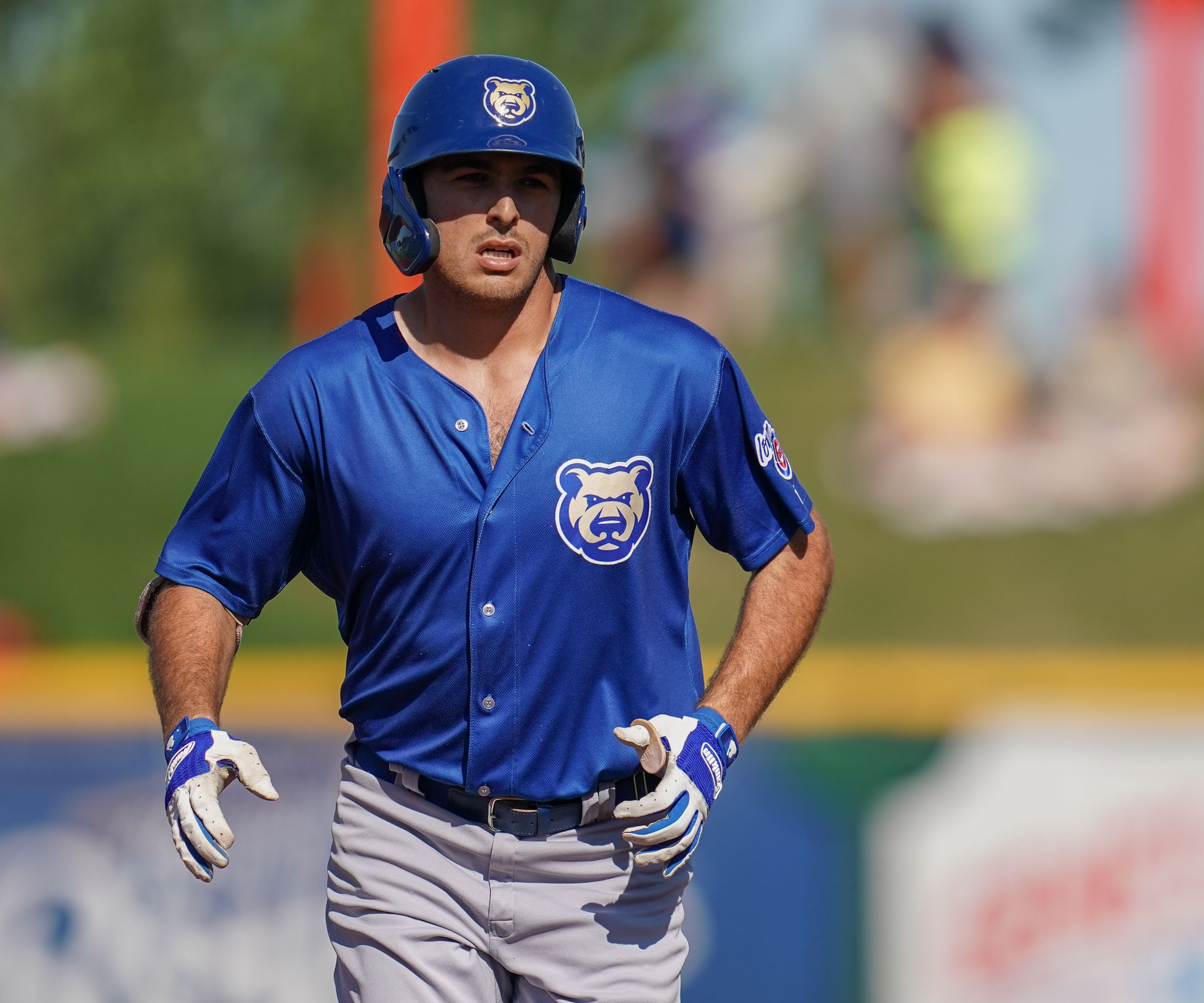
Matt Mervis, first baseman (Miami Marlins; Team Israel)

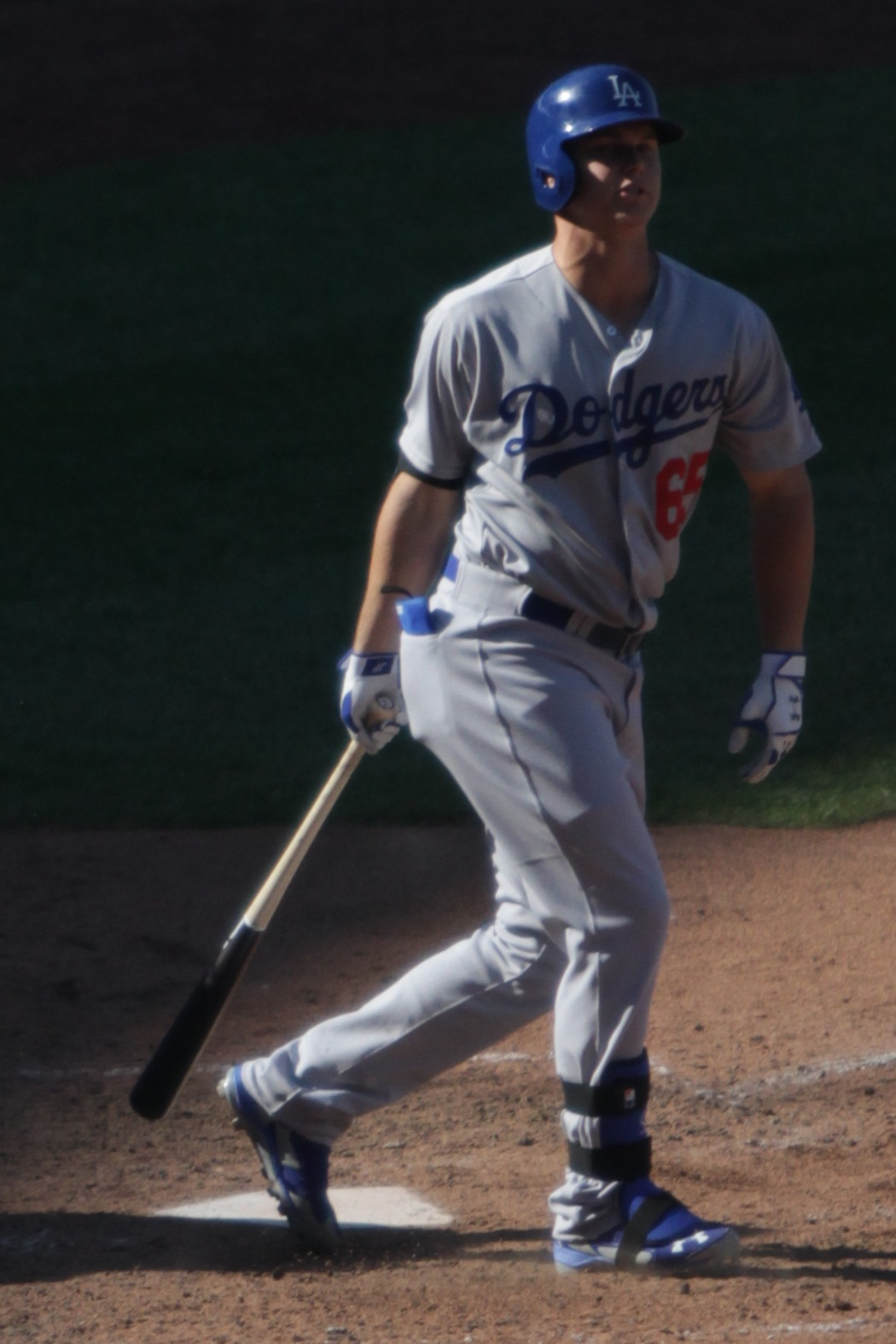
Joc Pederson, outfielder (Texas Rangers; Team Israel)

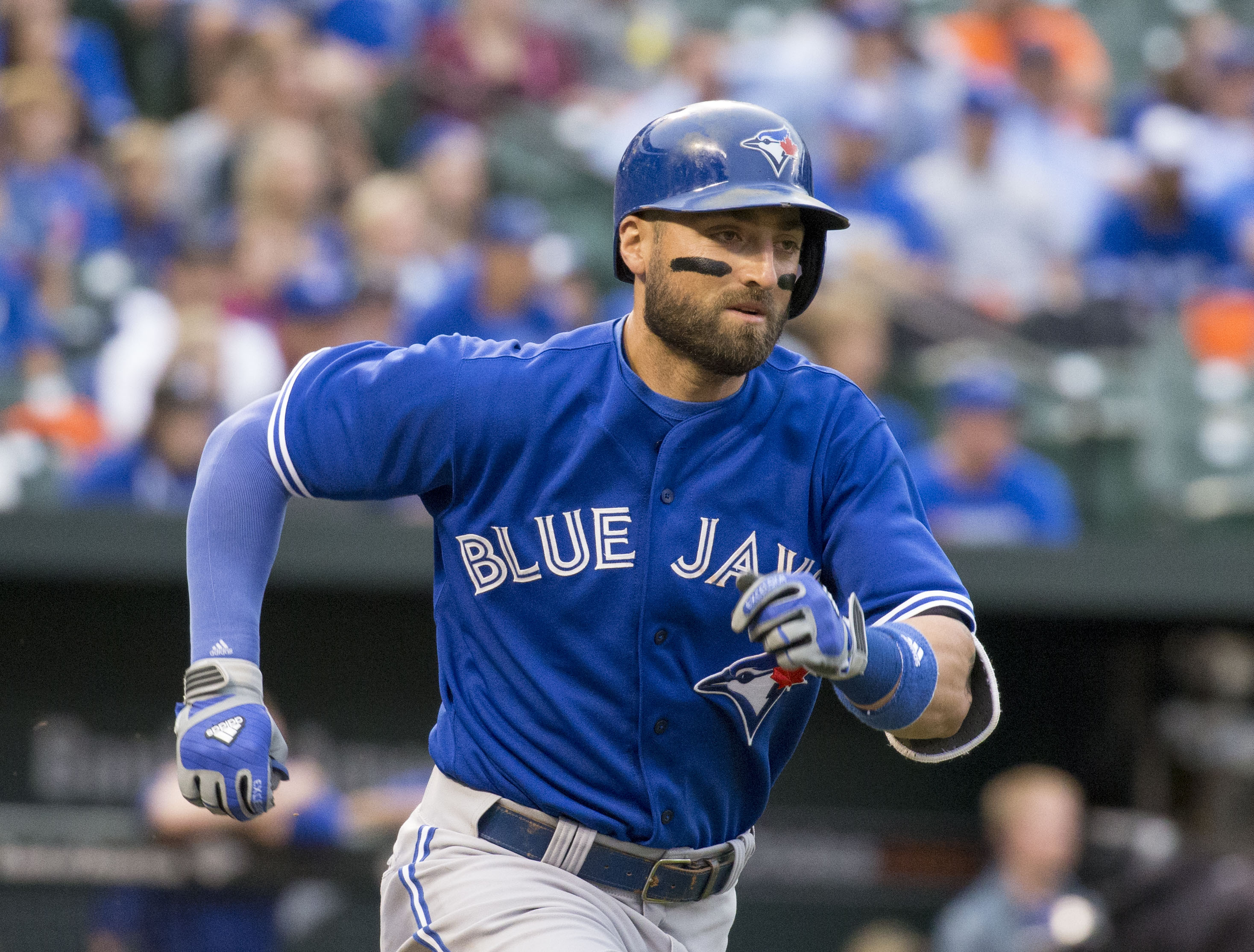
Kevin Pillar, outfielder (Texas Rangers; Team Israel)

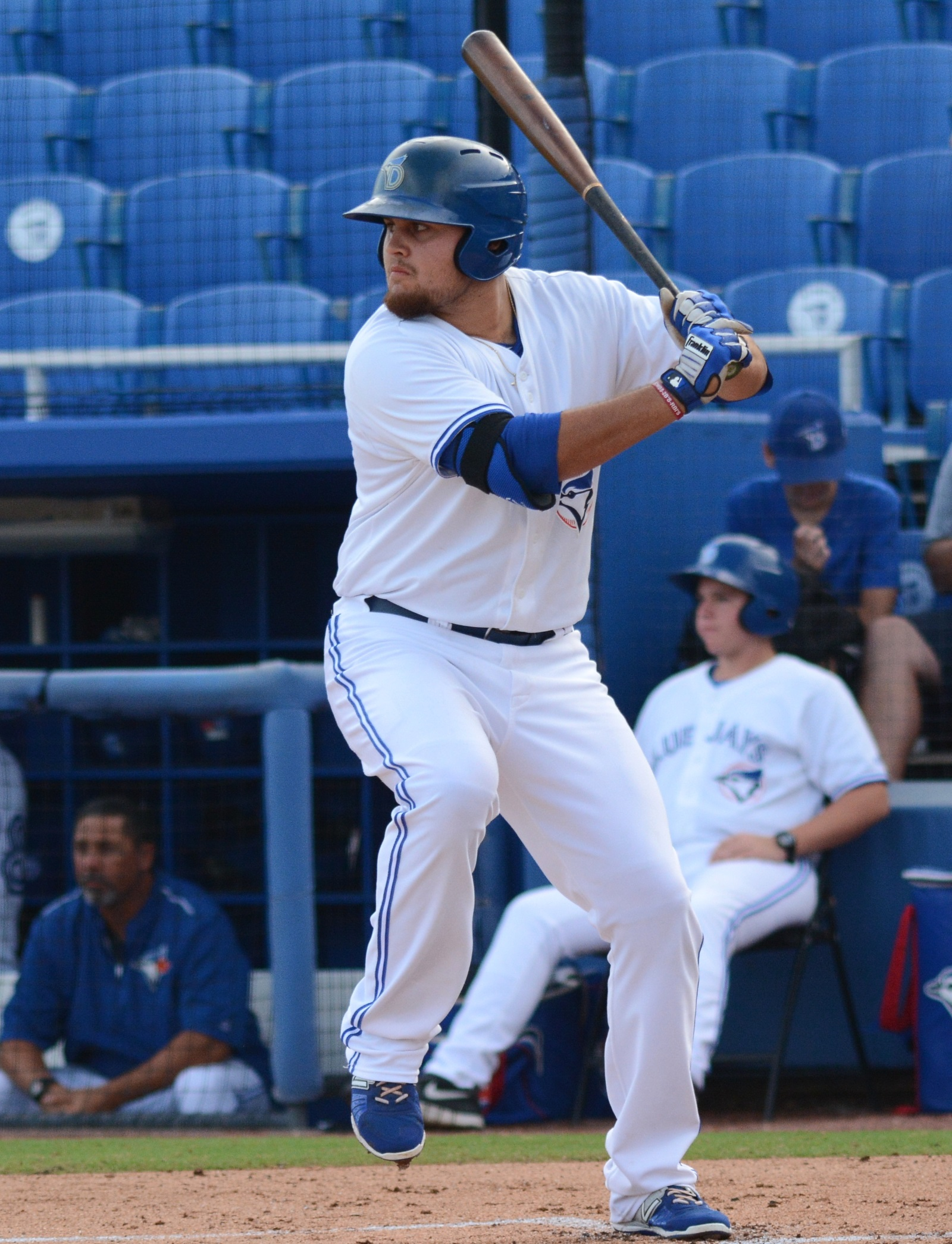
Rowdy Tellez, first baseman (Texas Rangers)

- Cal Abrams, US, outfielder
- Rubén Amaro, Jr., US, outfielder, general manager, first base coach
- Morrie "Snooker" Arnovich, US, outfielder, All-Star
- Brad Ausmus, US, catcher, All-Star, 3× Gold Glove, manager
- **Harrison Bader**, US, center fielder, Gold Glove (San Francisco Giants)
- José Bautista, Dominican-born, pitcher
- Robert "Bo" Belinsky, US, pitcher, no-hit game
- Moe Berg, US, catcher, and spy for US in World War II
- **Jake Bird**, US, pitcher (New York Yankees)
- Richard Bleier, US, pitcher (Washington Nationals organization, Team Israel)
- Ron "Boomer" Blomberg, US, DH/first baseman/outfielder, Major League Baseball's first designated hitter, Israel Baseball League manager
- Lou Boudreau, US, shortstop, 8× All-Star, batting title, MVP, Baseball Hall of Fame, manager
- Ralph "Hawk" Branca, US, pitcher, 3× All Star
- Ryan Braun, US, outfielder, 6× All-Star, home run champion, Rookie of the Year, 5× Silver Slugger, MVP (Milwaukee Brewers)
- **Alex Bregman**, US, infielder, 3× All Star, Silver Slugger (Chicago Cubs)
- Craig Breslow, US, relief pitcher
- Mark Clear, US, relief pitcher, 2× All-Star
- Andy Cohen, US, second baseman, coach
- Harry “the Horse” Danning, US, catcher, 4× All-Star
- Ike Davis, US, first baseman
- **Jonathan de Marte**, US-Israel, pitcher (Team Israel)
- Cody Decker, US, first baseman
- **Scott Effross**, US, pitcher (New York Yankees)
- Harry Eisenstat, US, pitcher
- Mike "Superjew" Epstein, US, first baseman
- Harry Feldman, US, pitcher
- Scott Feldman, US, pitcher
- Gavin Fingleson, South African-born Australian, Olympic silver medalist
- **Jake Fishman**, US-Israeli, pitcher (Oakland Athletics, Team Israel)
- Nate Freiman, US, first baseman
- **Max Fried**, US, pitcher, 3× All Star, 3× Gold Glove, 2× Fielding Bible Award, Silver Slugger (New York Yankees)
- Sam Fuld, US, outfielder and general manager
- **Zack Gelof**, US, second baseman (Oakland Athletics; Team Israel)
- Brad Goldberg, US, pitcher
- **Paul Goldschmidt**, US, first baseman (New York Yankees)
- Jake Goodman, US, first baseman
- **Colton Gordon**, US, pitcher (Houston Astros; Team Israel)
- Sid Gordon, US, outfielder & third baseman, 2× All-Star
- John Grabow, US, relief pitcher
- Shawn Green, US, right fielder, 2× All-Star, Gold Glove, Silver Slugger
- Adam Greenberg, US, outfielder
- Hank "The Hebrew Hammer" Greenberg, US, first baseman & outfielder, 5× All-Star, 4× home run champion, 4× RBI leader, 2× MVP, Baseball Hall of Fame
- **Dalton Guthrie**, US, infielder and outfielder (Boston Red Sox organization)
- Jason Hirsh, US, pitcher
- Ken Holtzman, US, starting pitcher, 2× All-Star, 2 no-hitters, Israel Baseball League manager
- Joe Horlen, US, pitcher, All-Star, ERA leader, no-hitter
- **Spencer Horwitz**, US, first baseman (Pittsburgh Pirates; Team Israel)
- **Jake Kalish**, US, pitcher (Los Angeles Angels; Team Israel)
- **Rob Kaminsky**, US, pitcher (St. Louis Cardinals; Team Israel)
- Gabe Kapler, US, outfielder, manager (San Francisco Giants), 2021 NL Manager of the Year
- **Ty Kelly**, US-Israeli, utility player (Seattle Mariners; Team Israel)
- Ian Kinsler, US-Israeli, second baseman, 4× All-Star, hit for the cycle, 2× 30–30 club, 2× Gold Glove, Fielding Bible Award
- Jason Kipnis, US, second baseman, 2x All-Star, Jewish ancestry, practicing Roman Catholic, self-identifies as Jewish
- Sandy Koufax, US, starting pitcher, 7× All-Star, 1 perfect game, 4 no-hitters, 3× Triple Crown, 5× ERA leader, 4× strikeouts leader, 3× wins leader, 2× W-L% leader, 2× World Series MVP, 3× Cy Young Award, MVP, Baseball Hall of Fame
- **Dean Kremer**, US-Israeli, pitcher (Baltimore Orioles; Team Israel)
- Barry Latman, US, pitcher, All-Star
- Ryan Lavarnway, US-Israeli, catcher (Miami Marlins; Team Israel)
- **Max Lazar**, US, pitcher (Philadelphia Phillies)
- Alon Leichman, Israel, former pitcher, now Miami Marlins assistant pitching coach
- Al Levine, US, relief pitcher
- Mike Lieberthal, US, catcher, 2× All-Star, Gold Glove
- **Shlomo Lipetz**, Israel, pitcher (Team Israel)
- **Assaf Lowengart**, Israel, outfielder (New York Boulders; Team Israel)
- Elliott Maddox, US, outfielder & third baseman
- Jason Marquis, US, starting pitcher, All-Star, Silver Slugger
- Erskine Mayer, US, pitcher
- Bob Melvin, US, catcher, manager (Oakland Athletics)
- **Matt "Mash" Mervis**, US, first baseman (Miami Marlins; Team Israel)
- **Eli Morgan**, US, pitcher (Chicago Cubs)
- Jon Moscot, US-Israeli, pitcher
- Sam Nahem, US, pitcher
- Jeff Newman, US, catcher & first baseman, All-Star, manager
- **Joc Pederson**, US, outfielder, 2x All Star (Texas Rangers, Team Israel)
- Barney "the Yiddish Curver" Pelty, US, pitcher
- Lefty Phillips, US; briefly a minor league pitcher in the 1930s, later a pitching coach and manager
- Lip "the Iron Batter" Pike, US, outfielder, second baseman, manager, 4× home run champion, RBI leader
- **Kevin Pillar**, US, outfielder (Texas Rangers, Team Israel)
- Scott Radinsky, US, relief pitcher and coach
- Jimmie Reese, US, second baseman & third baseman
- Dave Roberts, US, pitcher
- Saul Rogovin, US, pitcher, ERA leader
- Al "Flip" Rosen, US, third baseman & first baseman, 4× All Star, 2× home run champion, 2× RBI leader, MVP
- Goody Rosen, Canada, outfielder, All-Star
- **Kenny Rosenberg**, US, pitcher (Los Angeles Angels)
- **Bubby Rossman**, US-Israeli, pitcher (New York Mets; Team Israel)
- Richie Scheinblum, US, outfielder, All-Star
- Scott Schoeneweis, US, pitcher
- Art Shamsky, US, outfielder & first baseman, Israel Baseball League manager
- **Ryan Sherriff**, US, pitcher (Boston Red Sox; Team Israel)
- Larry Sherry, US, relief pitcher, World Series MVP
- Norm Sherry, US, catcher, manager
- **Jared Shuster**, US, pitcher (Chicago White Sox)
- Mose "the Rabbi of Swat" Solomon, US, outfielder, set minor league home run record
- **Robert Stock**, US, pitcher (Boston Red Sox; Team Israel)
- Steve Stone, US, starting pitcher, All-Star, wins leader, Cy Young Award
- **CJ Stubbs**, US, catcher (Washington Nationals; Team Israel)
- **Garrett Stubbs**, US, catcher (Philadelphia Phillies; Team Israel)
- **Rowdy Tellez**, US, first baseman (Texas Rangers)
- Danny Valencia, US-Israeli, third baseman (Team Israel)
- Phil "Mickey" Weintraub, US, first baseman & outfielder
- **Zack Weiss**, US-Israeli, pitcher (St. Louis Cardinals; Team Israel)
- Steve Yeager, US, catcher, World Series MVP
- **Andy Yerzy**, Canada, catcher/first baseman (St. Louis Cardinals organization)
- Kevin Youkilis, US, first baseman, third baseman, & left fielder, 3× All-Star, Gold Glove, Hank Aaron Award
- Josh Zeid, US-Israeli, pitcher (Team Israel)

== Basketball ==
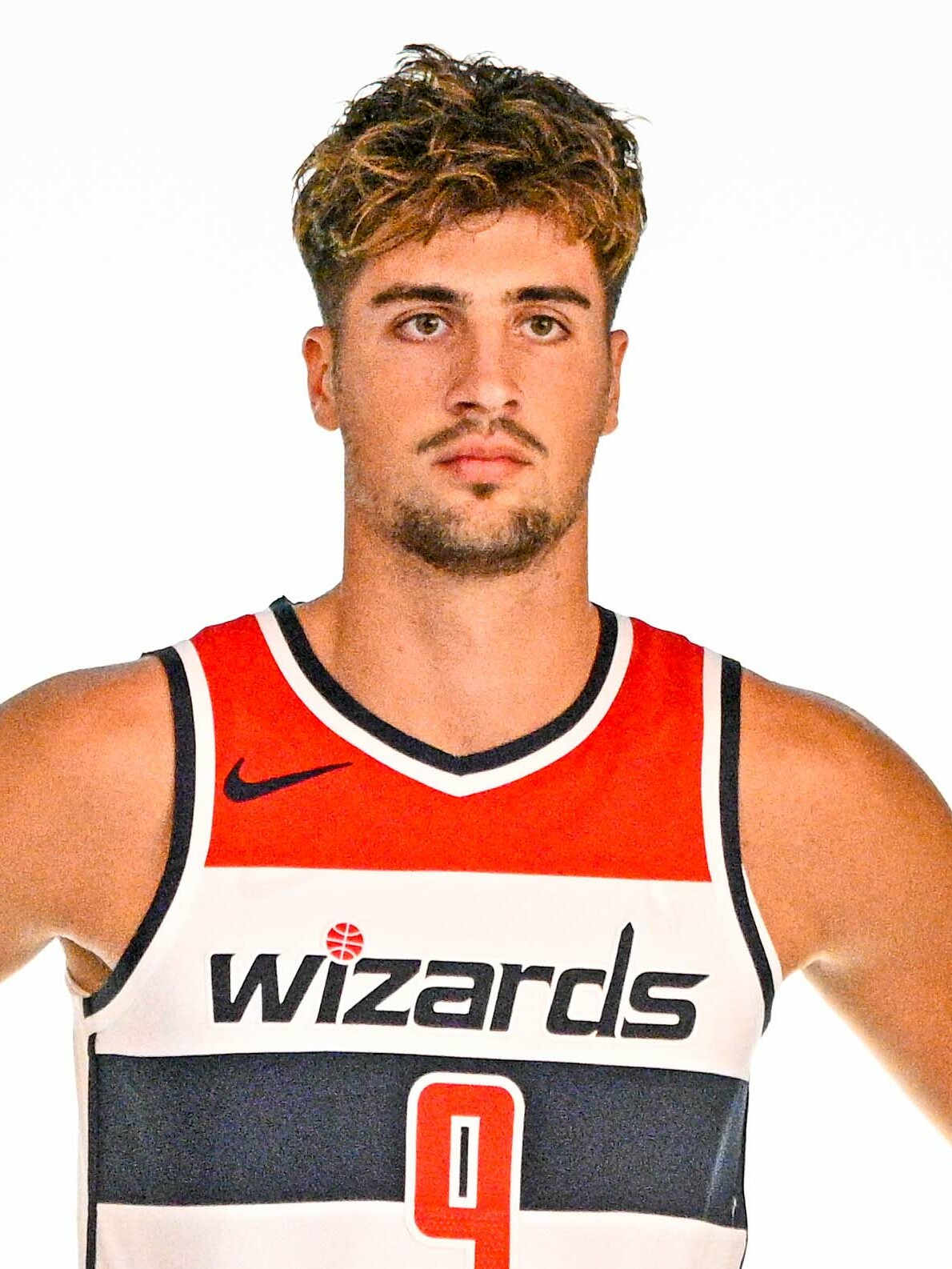
Deni Avdija

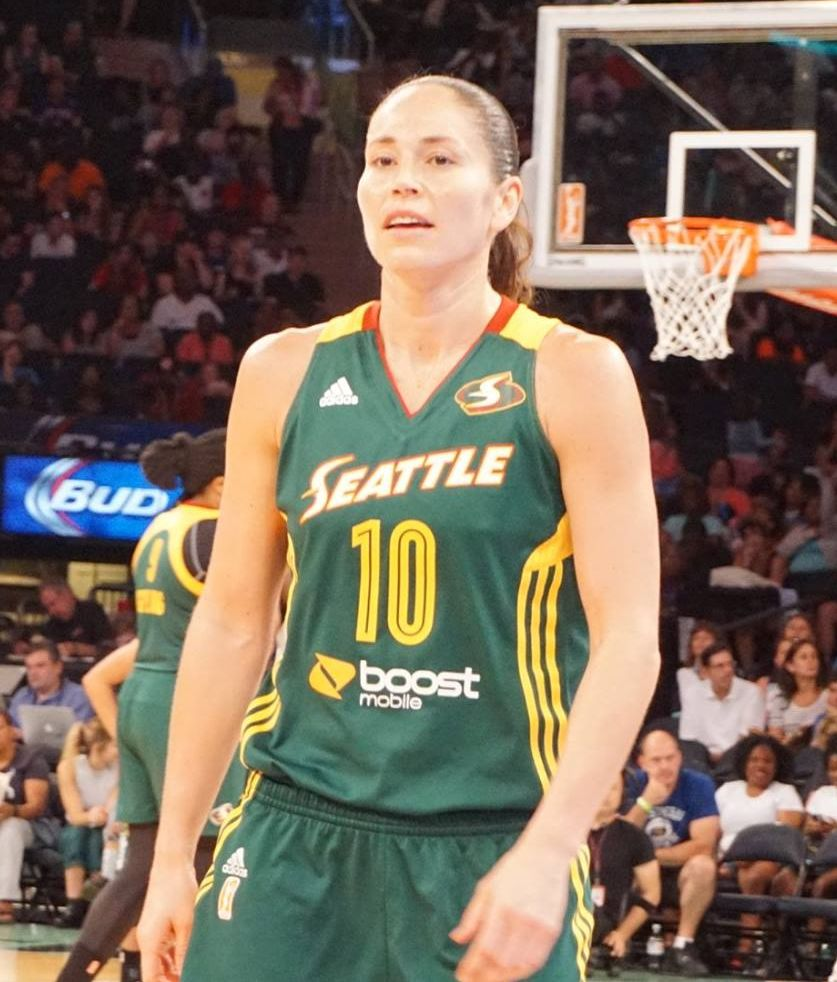
Sue Bird

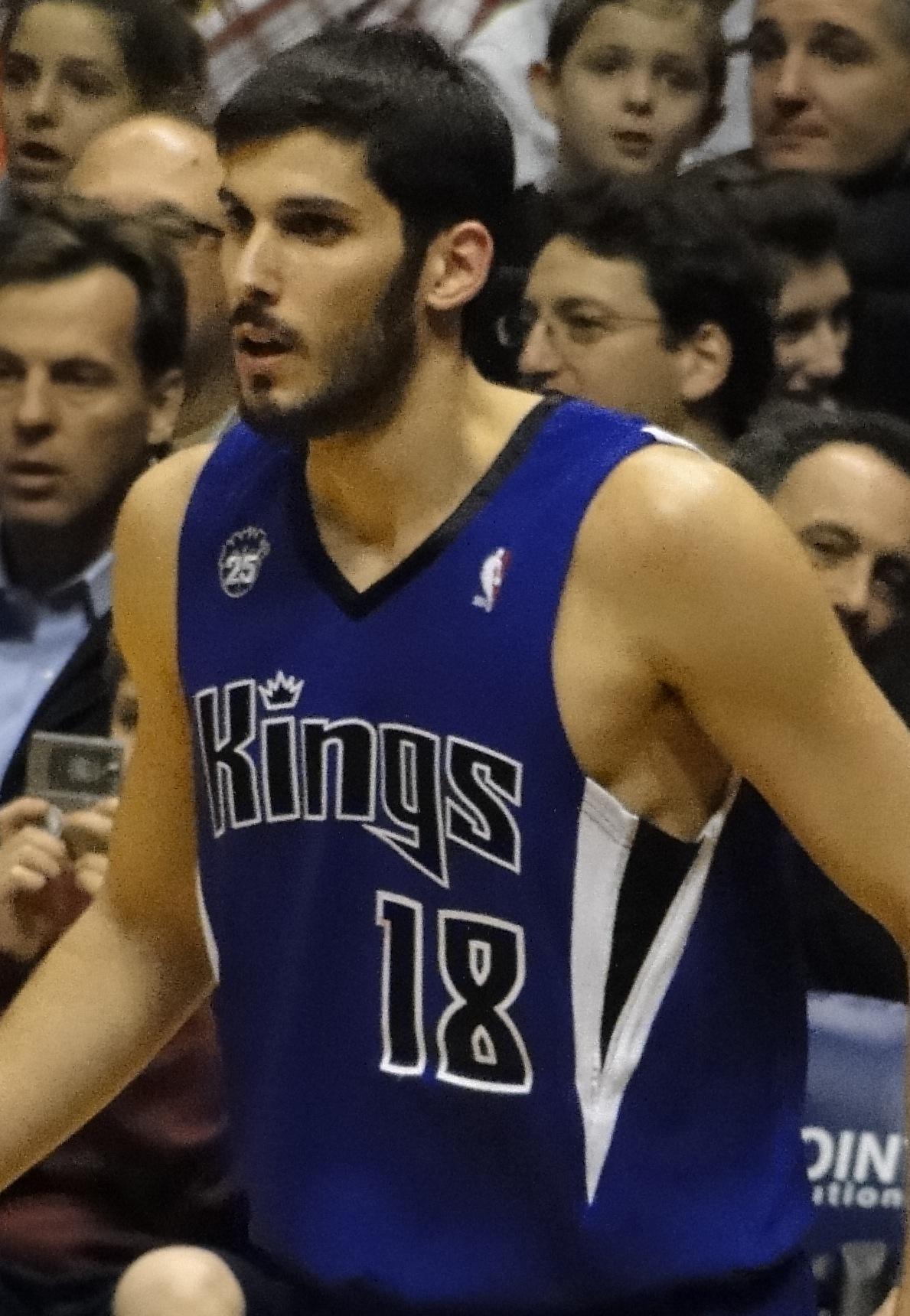
Omri Casspi

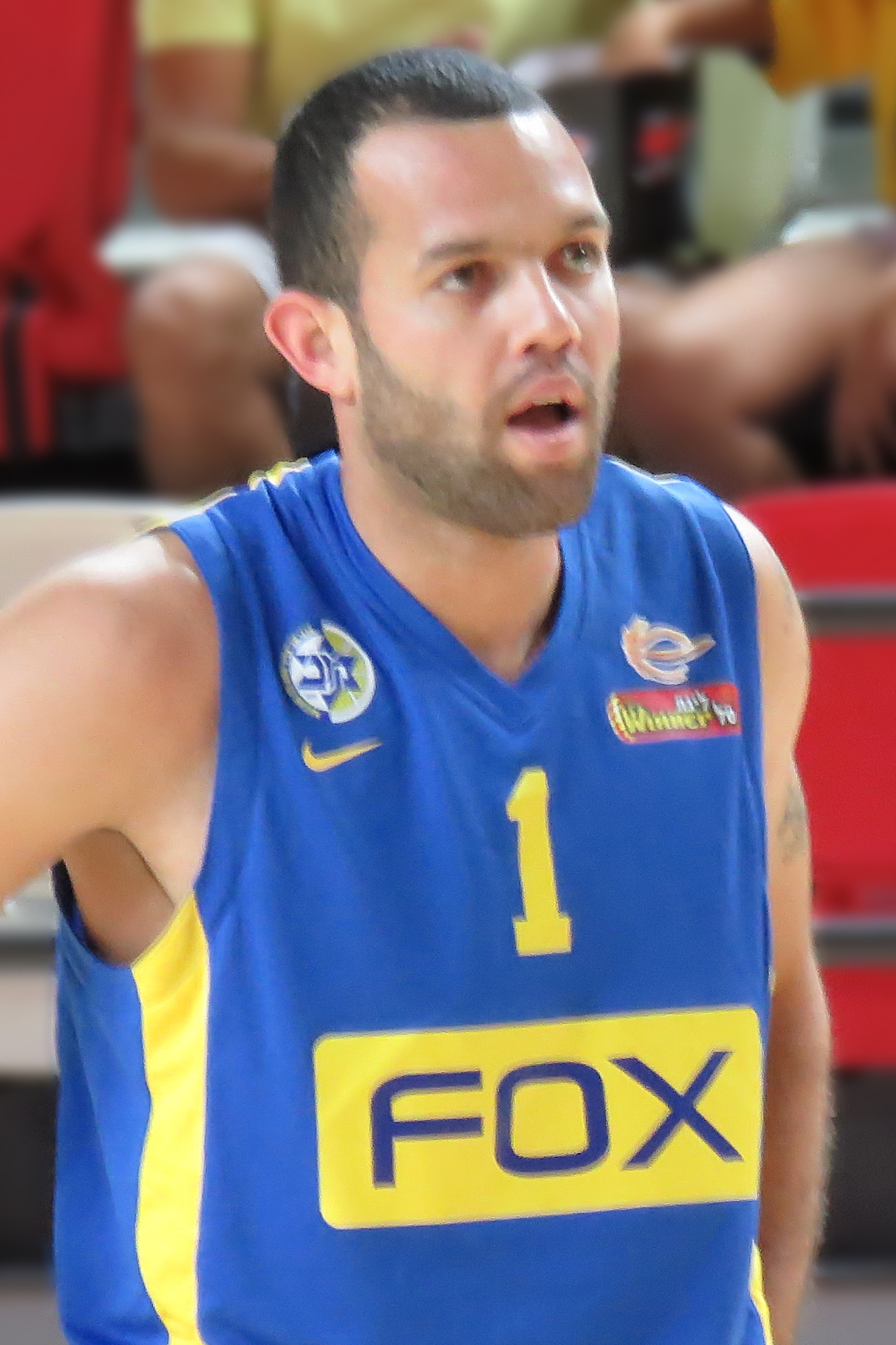
Jordan Farmar

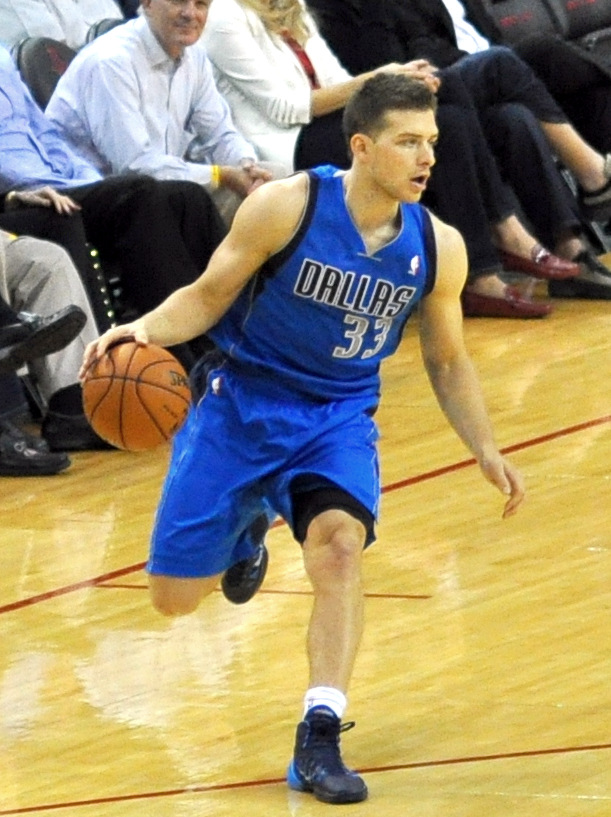
Gal Mekel

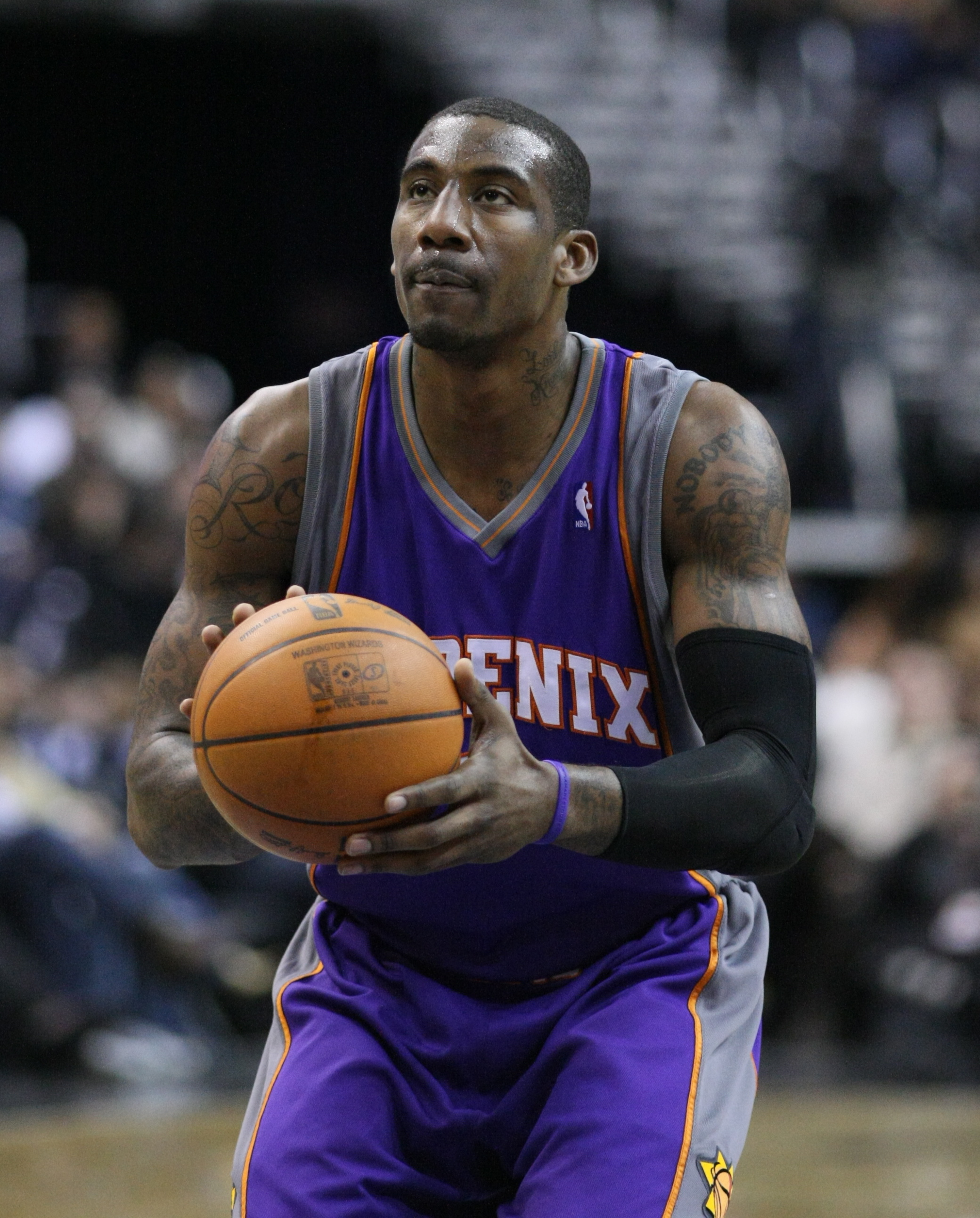
Amar'e Stoudemire

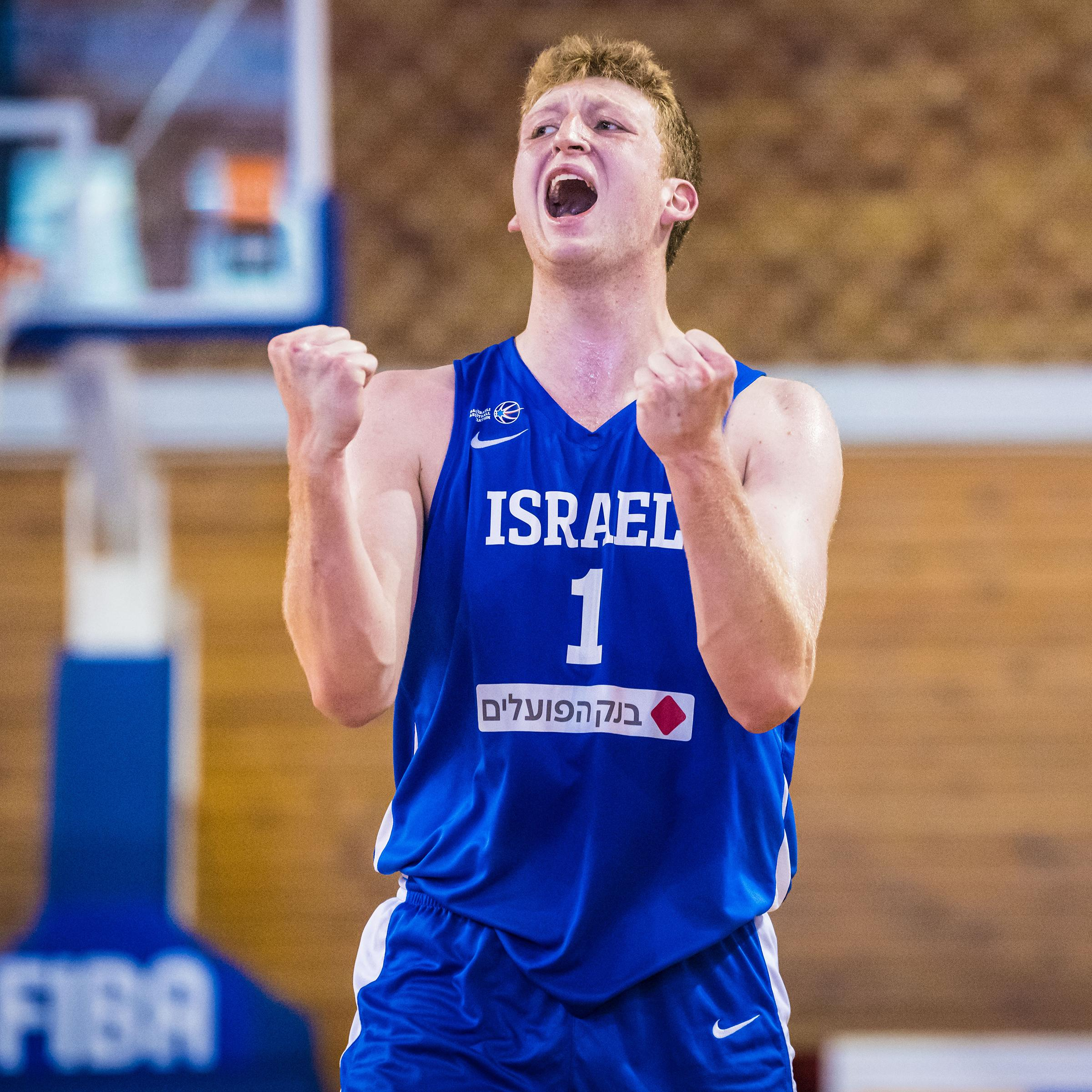
Danny Wolf

- **Eli Abaev**, US & Israel, 6' 8" forward/center (Elitzur Yavne)
- Joe Alexander, US & Israel, 6' 8" forward
- Ben Auerbach, US, 6' 1" guard
- Red Auerbach, US, guard for George Washington University; Naismith Basketball Hall of Fame-inducted coach of the Boston Celtics
- **Deni Avdija**, Israel, NBA 6' 9" power forward (Portland Trail Blazers)
- **Amari Bailey**, US, NBA 6' 3" shooting guard (Charlotte Hornets)
- Sam Balter, US, 5' 10" guard, Olympic champion
- Miki Berkovich, Israel, 6' 4" shooting guard, Eurobasket MVP, 4x FIBA European All Star
- Sue Bird, US & Israel, WNBA 5' 9" point guard, 5x Olympic champion, 4x world champion, 13x All-Star (Seattle Storm)
- Moysés Blás, Brazil, Olympics 5' 11" guard
- David Blatt, US & Israel, Israeli Premier Basketball League 6' 3.5" point guard, coached Russia National Basketball Team, Israel's Maccabi Tel Aviv to EuroLeague Championship, EuroLeague Coach of the Year, 4× Israeli League Coach of the Year, former head coach of the Cleveland Cavaliers, head coach of Turkish club Darussafaka
- Mike Bloom, US, NBA 6' 6" forward/center, ABA All-American
- David Blu (formerly "Bluthenthal"), US & Israel, EuroLeague 6' 7" power forward (Maccabi Tel Aviv)
- **Frédéric Bourdillon**, France & Israel, Israeli Basketball Premier League 6' 4" shooting guard (Bnei Herzliya Basket)
- Harry Boykoff, US, NBA 6' 10" center
- Tal Brody, US & Israel, EuroLeague 6' 2" shooting guard
- Larry Brown, US, ABA 5' 9" point guard, 3× ABA All-Star, 3× assists leader, NCAA National Championship coach (1988), NBA coach, Olympic champion, Basketball Hall of Fame
- Omri Casspi, Israel, NBA 6' 9" small forward, drafted in 1st round of 2009 NBA draft, for Memphis Grizzlies (Maccabi Tel Aviv)
- Steve Chubin, US, ABA 6' 3" guard
- **Alex Chubrevich**, Israel & Russia, Premier League 7' 0" center (Maccabi Haifa)
- **Alysha Clark**, US-Israel, WNBA 5' 11" small forward (Washington Mystics)
- Jeff Cohen, US, ABL 6' 7" power forward
- **Shawn Dawson**, Israel, 6' 6" small forward/shooting guard (Hapoel Holon)
- **Shay Doron**, Israel & US, WNBA 5' 9" guard (Maccabi Ashdod)
- Stu Douglass, US & Israel, 6' 3" shooting guard
- Lior Eliyahu, Israel, EuroLeague 6' 9" power forward, 2006 NBA draft (Orlando Magic; traded to Houston Rockets), playing in the EuroCup (European top tier) (Maccabi Ashdod)
- Jordan Farmar, US, NBA 6' 2" point guard
- Marty Friedman, US, 5' 7" guard & coach, Hall of Fame
- Jack Garfinkel, US, NBA 6' 0" guard
- Todd Golden, US-Israel, 6' 3", national championship head coach at the University of Florida
- Tamir Goodman, US-Israel, 6' 3"
- Ernie Grunfeld, Romania-born US, NBA 6' 6" guard/forward & GM, Olympic champion
- Yotam Halperin, Israel, EuroLeague 6' 5" guard, drafted in 2006 NBA draft by Seattle SuperSonics
- Sonny Hertzberg, US, NBA 5' 9" point guard, original NY Knickerbocker
- Art Heyman, US, NBA 6' 5" forward/guard
- Nat Holman, US, ABL 5' 11" guard & coach, Hall of Fame
- Red Holzman, US, BAA & NBA 5' 10" guard, 2× All-Star, & NBA coach, NBA Coach of the Year, Hall of Fame
- Eban Hyams, India-Israel-Australia, Australian National Basketball League & Israeli Super League 6' 5" guard (Haryana Gold), first-ever Indian national to play in ULEB competitions
- Doron Jamchi, Israel, Israeli Basketball Premier League 6' 6" shooting guard/small forward
- Jacqui Kalin, US/Israel, Israel League 5' 8" point guard
- Oded Kattash, Israel, Premier League 6' 4" point guard & coach
- Barry Kramer, US, NBA, ABA 6' 4" forward
- Joel Kramer, US, NBA 6' 7" forward
- Dave Kufeld, US/Israel, 6' 8", first Orthodox Jew selected in the NBA draft
- **Sylven Landesberg**, US-Israel-Austria, EuroLeague 6' 6" former UVA shooting guard/small forward (Hapoel Haifa)
- Rudy LaRusso, US, NBA 6' 7" forward/center, 5× All-Star
- Howard Lassoff, US/Israel, 6' 10" center, 6x Israeli Basketball League Champion with Maccabi Tel Aviv
- Nancy Lieberman, US, WNBA 5' 10" point guard, general manager, & coach, Olympic silver, Hall of Fame
- **Yam Madar**, Israel, 6' 3" guard (Hapoel Tel Aviv) drafted by the NBA's Boston Celtics in 2020
- Jan Martín, Germany-Spain-Israel, 6' 8" center/forward
- Gal Mekel, Israel, 6' 3" point guard
- Irving Meretsky, Canada, Olympic silver medallist
- **Abby Meyers**, US, WNBA 6' 0" guard (Dallas Wings)
- **Yogev Ohayon**, Israel, Super League 6' 2" point guard (Hapoel Holon)
- Bernard Opper, US, NBL & ABL 5' 10" guard, All-American at University of Kentucky
- Donna Orender (née Chait), US, Women's Pro Basketball League 5' 7" point guard, All-Star, former WNBA president
- Josh Pastner, US, NCAA 6' 0" guard & coach
- Zack Rosen, US, Super League 6' 1" point guard
- Lennie Rosenbluth, US, NBA 6' 4" forward
- **Domantas Sabonis**, Lithuania & US, NBA 6' 10" center, 3× All-Star, 2× All-NBA, 2× league rebounding leader (Sacramento Kings)
- **Ben Saraf**, Israel, NBA 6’ 6” guard (Brooklyn Nets)
- **Avi Schafer**, Japan, B.League, 6' 10" center (SeaHorses Mikawa)
- Danny Schayes, US, NBA 6' 11" center/forward (son of Dolph Schayes)
- Dolph Schayes, US, NBA 6' 7" forward/center, 3× FT% leader, 1× rebound leader, 12× All-Star, Hall of Fame, & coach (father of Danny Schayes)
- Ossie Schectman, US, NBA 6' 0" guard, scorer of first NBA basket
- Jon Scheyer, US, All-American, 6' 5" shooting guard & point guard (Maccabi Tel Aviv), head coach Duke University
- Barney Sedran, US, Hudson River League & New York State League 5' 4" guard, Hall of Fame
- Ezequiel Skverer, Argentina & Israel, 5' 11" point guard
- Tiago Splitter, Brazil, NBA 6' 11" power forward/center
- Amar'e Stoudemire, US & Israel, NBA 6' 10" power forward/center, 6× NBA All-Star, NBA Rookie of the Year (2003), 5× All-NBA Team
- Amit Tamir, Israel, Israel League 6' 10" power forward/center
- Sidney Tannenbaum, US, BAA 6' 0" guard, 2× All-American, left as NYU all-time scorer
- **Alex Tyus**, US & Israel, 6' 8" power forward/center (ASVEL Basket)
- Neal Walk, US, NBA 6' 10" center
- **Spencer Weisz**, US & Israel, Premier League 6' 4" shooting guard/small forward (Hapoel Haifa)
- Jamila Wideman, US, WNBA 5' 6" guard
- **Danny Wolf**, Israel & US, NBA 6’ 11” center (Brooklyn Nets)
- Max Zaslofsky, US, NBA 6' 2" guard/forward, 1× FT% leader, 1× points leader, All-Star, ABA coach

== Bowling ==
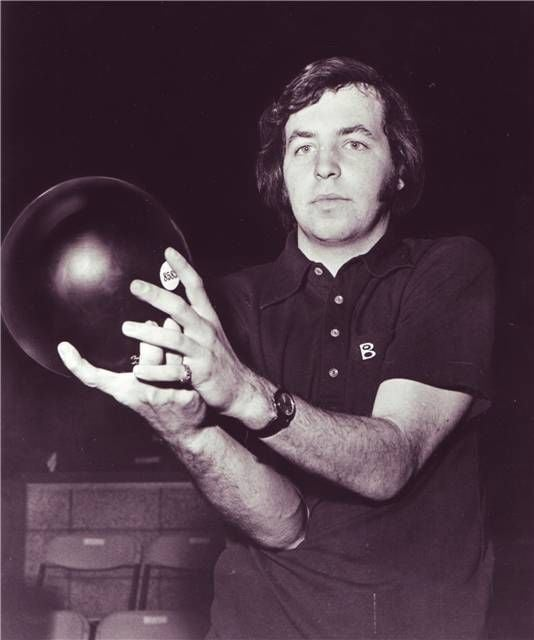
Mark Roth

- Barry Asher, US, 10 PBA titles, PBA Hall of Fame
- Guy Caminsky, South Africa, 2008 World Tenpin Masters champion
- Marshall Holman, US, 22 PBA titles (13th all-time); PBA Hall of Fame
- Mort Lindsey, American bowler
- Mark Roth, US, 34 PBA titles (6th all-time); PBA Hall of Fame

== Boxing ==
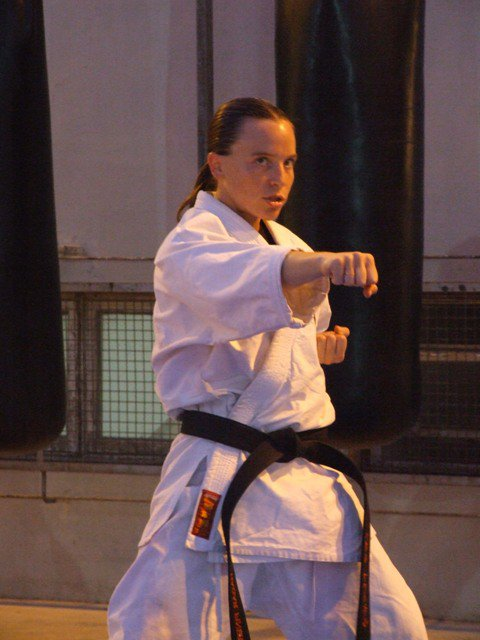
Hagar Finer

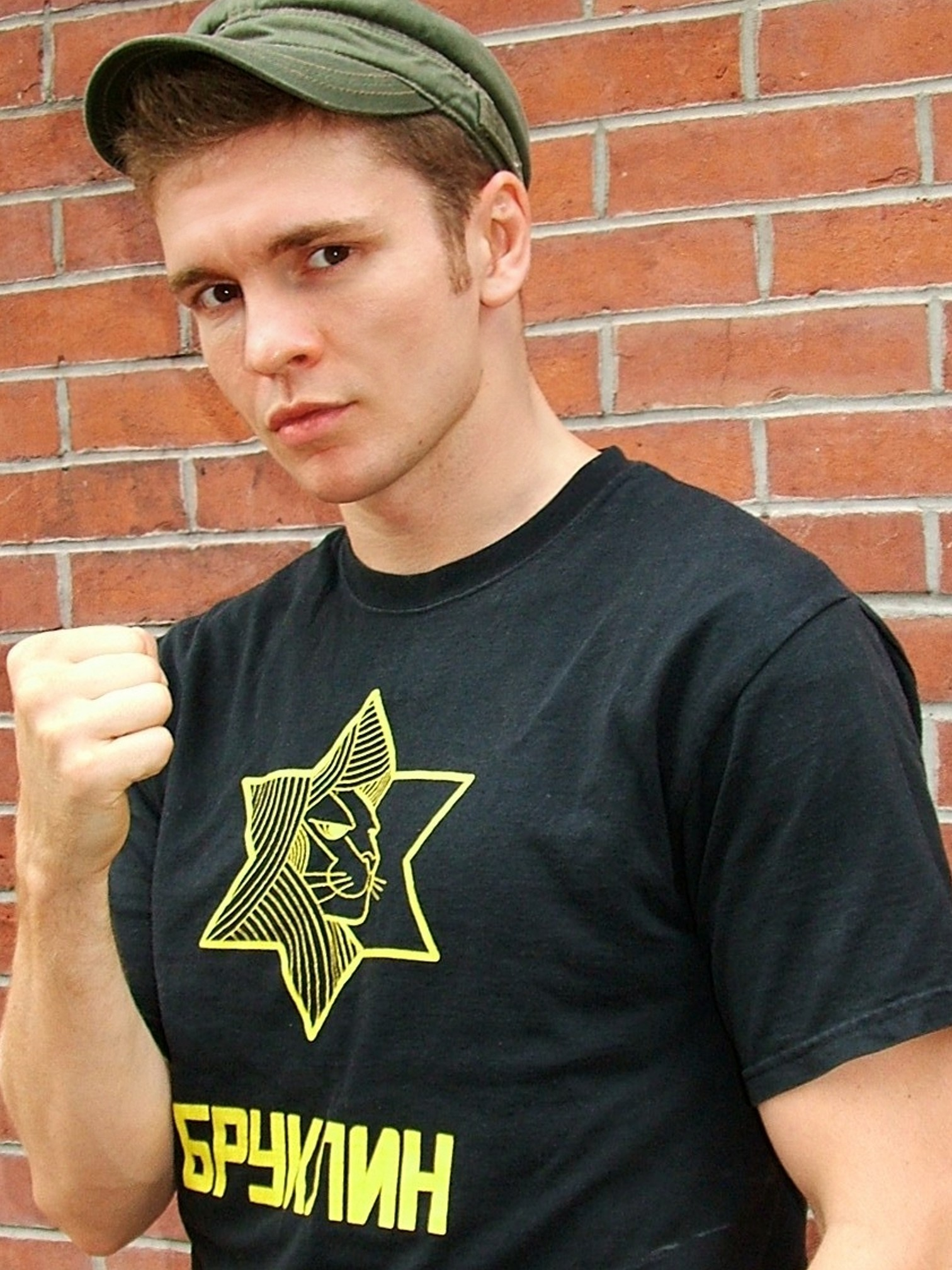
Yuri Foreman

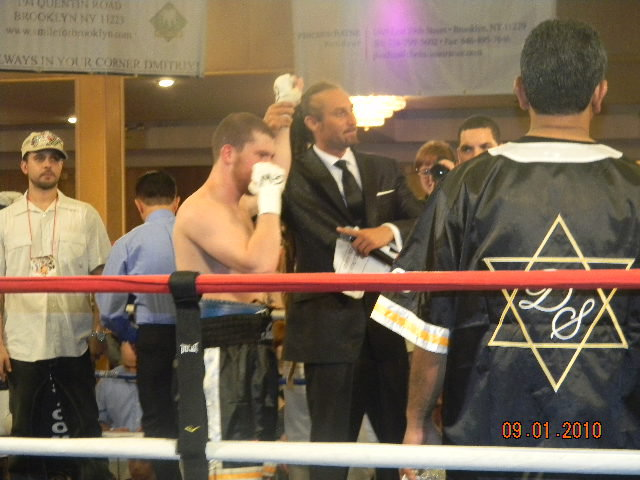
Dmitry Salita

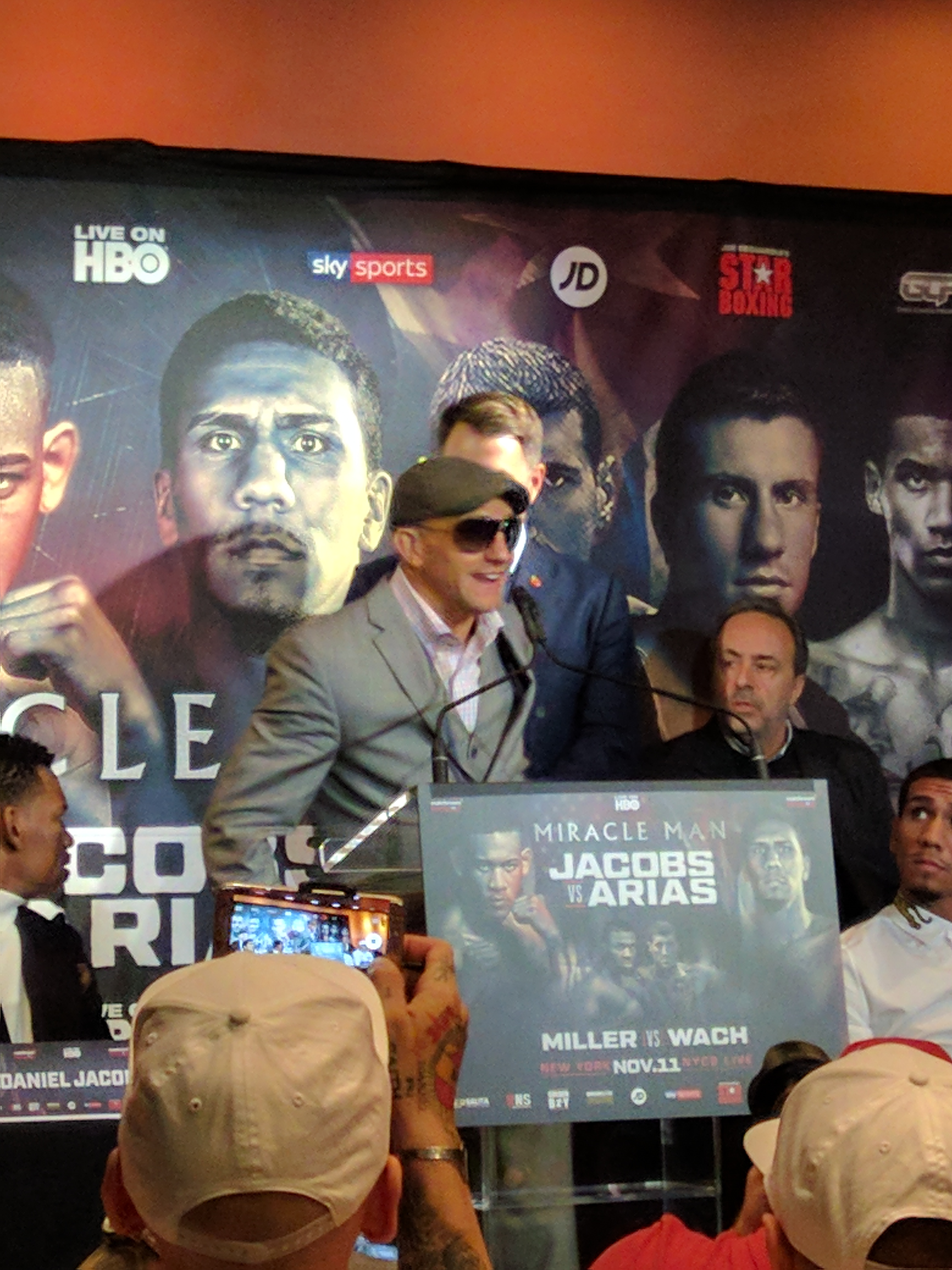
Cletus Seldin

- Barney Aaron (Young), English-born US lightweight, Hall of Fame
- Salamo Arouch (The Ballet Dancer), Greece & Israel, the Middleweight Champion of Greece 1938, and the All-Balkans Middleweight Champion 1939
- Abe Attell ("The Little Hebrew"), US, world champion featherweight, 1906–12, Hall of Fame
- Monte Attell ("The Knob Hill Terror"), US, bantamweight
- Max Baer, US, world heavyweight champion 1934–35, wore a Star of David on his trunks
- Benny Bass ("Little Fish"), US, world champion featherweight & world champion junior lightweight, 1927–29, Hall of Fame
- Fabrice Benichou, France, world champion super bantamweight 1989
- Jack Kid Berg (Judah Bergman), England, world champion lightweight 1930, wore a Star of David on his trunks, Hall of Fame
- Maxie Berger, Canada, flyweight, junior welterweight, and welterweight, wore a Star of David on his trunks
- Samuel Berger, US, Olympic champion heavyweight 1904
- Jack Bernstein (also "John Dodick", "Kid Murphy", and "Young Murphy"), US, world champion junior lightweight 1923
- Nathan "Nat" Bor, US, Olympic bronze lightweight 1932
- Mushy Callahan (Vincente Sheer), US, world champion light welterweight 1926-30
- Joe Choynski ("Chrysanthemum Joe"), US, heavyweight, Hall of Fame
- Gilbert Cohen French welterweight champion, 1978
- Nessim Max Cohen Two-time French middleweight champion; Star of David on his trunks
- Robert Cohen, French & Algerian, world champion bantamweight 1954-56
- Al "Bummy" Davis (Abraham Davidoff), US, welterweight & lightweight, wore a Star of David on his trunks
- Louis "Red" Deutsch, US, heavyweight, later famous as the proprietor of the Tube Bar in Jersey City, New Jersey and inspiration for Moe Szyslak on The Simpsons
- Carolina Duer ("The Turk"), Argentine, WBO world champion super flyweight 2010, and bantamweight 2013
- John "Jackie" Fields (Jacob Finkelstein), US, world champion welterweight 1929 & Olympic champion featherweight 1924, Hall of Fame
- Hagar Finer, Israel, WIBF champion bantamweight 2009
- Nat Fleischer, founder of Ring Magazine
- Yuri Foreman, Belarusian-born Israeli US middleweight and World Boxing Association champion super welterweight 2009
- Alexander Frenkel, undefeated cruiserweight who retired early
- Bernie Friedkin, lightweight boxer in the late 1930s and early 1940s
- György Gedó, Hungary, Olympic champion light flyweight 1972
- Abe Goldstein, US, world champion bantamweight 1924
- Ruby Goldstein ("Ruby the Jewel of the Ghetto"), US, welterweight, wore a Star of David on his trunks
- Roman Greenberg ("The Lion from Zion"), Israel, International Boxing Organization's Intercontinental champion heavyweight
- Stéphane Haccoun, France, featherweight, super featherweight, and junior lightweight
- Alphonse Halimi ("La Petite Terreur"), France, world champion bantamweight 1957
- Harry Harris ("The Human Hairpin"), US, world champion bantamweight 1901-02
- Abe "The Newsboy" Hollandersky, US, Panamanian heavyweight champion, American welterweight reputed to have fought 1,000 fights
- Harry Isaacs, South Africa, Olympic bronze medalist 1928
- Pavlo Ishchenko ("Wild Man"), Ukraine/Israel, bantamweight & lightweight, 2× European Amateur Boxing Championships medalist, and European Games medalist
- Gary Jacobs, Scottish, British, Commonwealth, and European (EBU) champion welterweight
- Ben Jeby (Morris Jebaltowsky), US, world champion middleweight 1933
- Vitali Klitschko, Ukraine, heavyweight champion
- Wladimir Klitschko, Ukraine, heavyweight champion
- Julie Kogon, US, 1947 New England Lightweight Champion; Connecticut Boxing Hall of Fame
- Solly Krieger ("Danny Auerbach"), US, world champion middleweight 1938-39
- Benny Leonard (Benjamin Leiner; "The Ghetto Wizard"), US, world champion lightweight 1917–1925, Hall of Fame
- Battling Levinsky (Barney Lebrowitz), US, world champion light heavyweight 1916–1920, Hall of Fame
- King Levinsky (Harry Kraków), US, heavyweight, also known as Kingfish Levinsky
- Harry Lewis (Harry Besterman), US, world champion welterweight 1908-11
- Ted "Kid" Lewis (Gershon Mendeloff), England, world champion welterweight (1915–1916, 1917–1919), Hall of Fame
- Sammy Luftspring, Canada, Canadian champion welterweight, Canada's Sports Hall of Fame
- Saoul Mamby, US, WBC super lightweight champion (1980–1982)
- Al McCoy (Alexander Rudolph), US, world champion middleweight 1914–17
- Daniel Mendoza, England, England Champion welterweight and heavyweight 1784–1795, Hall of Fame
- Michael Michaelsen, Denmark, Olympic bronze heavyweight 1928 and European Champion 1930
- Samuel Mosberg, US, Olympic champion lightweight 1920
- Bob Olin, US, world champion light heavyweight 1934–35
- Victor Perez ("Young"), Tunisia, world champion flyweight 1931–32
- Harold Reitman ("The Boxing Doctor"), professional heavyweight, fought while working as surgeon, Golden Gloves champion
- Charlie Phil Rosenberg ("Charles Green"), US, world champion bantamweight 1925-27
- Dana Rosenblatt ("Dangerous"), US, world champion middleweight IBA 1999
- Maxie Rosenbloom ("Slapsie"), US, world champion light heavyweight, wore a Star of David on his trunks, Hall of Fame
- Barney Ross (Dov-Ber Rasofsky), US, world champion lightweight, junior welterweight & welterweight, Hall of Fame
- Mike Rossman (Michael Albert DiPiano; "The Jewish Bomber"), US, world champion light heavyweight, wore Star of David on trunks
- Szapsel Rotholc, Poland, flyweight
- Dmitry Salita ("Star of David"), US, North American Boxing Association champion light welterweight
- Isadore "Corporal Izzy" Schwartz ("The Ghetto Midget"), US, world champion flyweight
- Cletus Seldin ("Hebrew Hammer"), US, light welterweight, welterweight, WBC International Silver junior welterweight champion
- Abe Simon ("Big Abe Simon"), US, Last Jewish fighter to fight for the heavyweight title
- Al Singer ("The Bronx Beauty"), US, world champion lightweight
- Bruce "The Mouse" Strauss, middleweight, only fighter to be knocked out on six continents
- "Lefty" Lew Tendler, US, bantamweight, lightweight, and welterweight; wore a Star of David on his trunks; Hall of Fame
- Sid Terris ("Ghost of the Ghetto"), US, lightweight, wore a Star of David on his trunks
- Matt Wells, England, lightweight champion of Great Britain and world champion welterweight
- Jack "Kid" Wolfe, Russian-born US, superbantumweight
- Victor Zilberman, Romania, welterweight, Olympic bronze medalist

== Canoeing ==
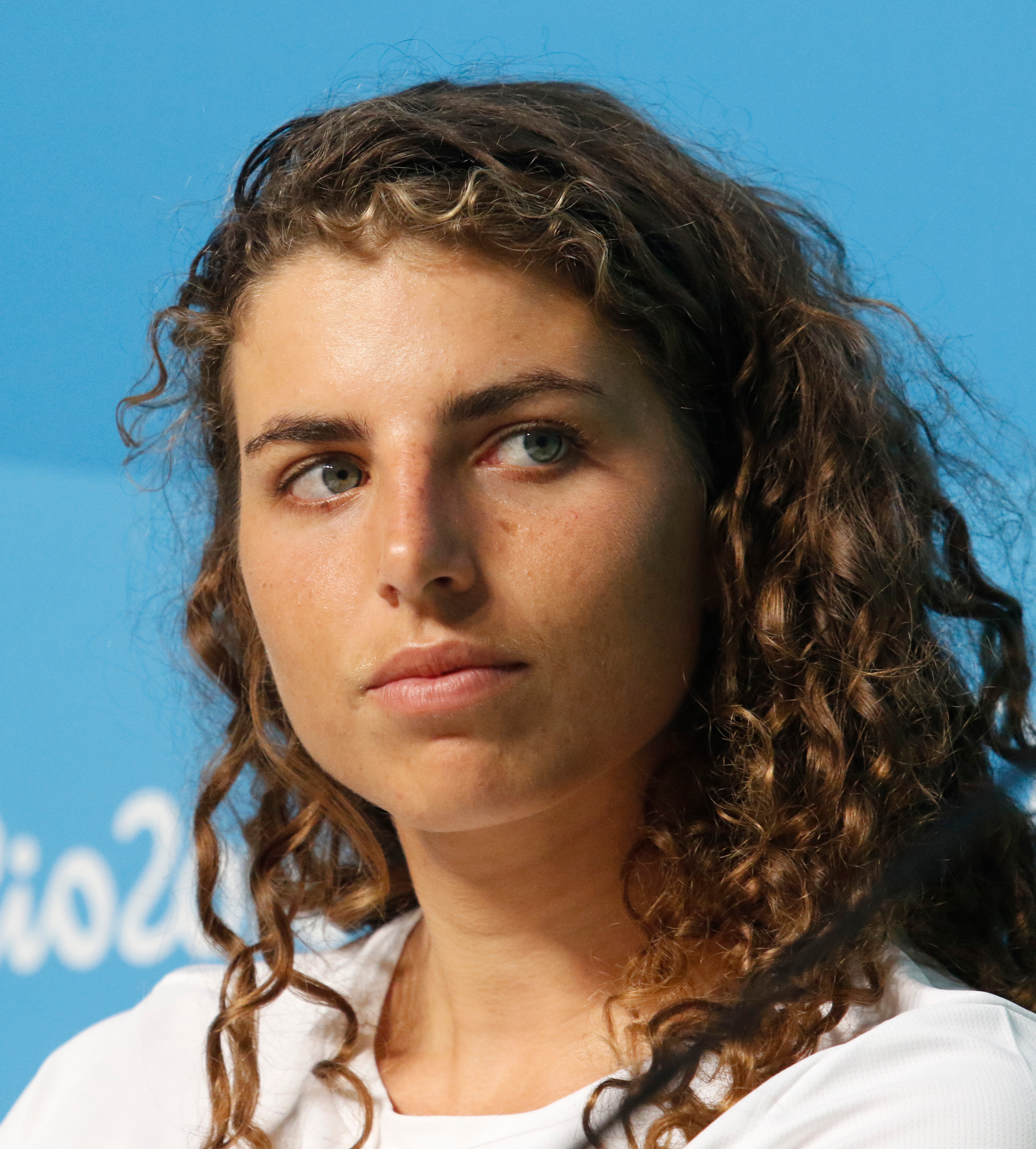
Jessica Fox

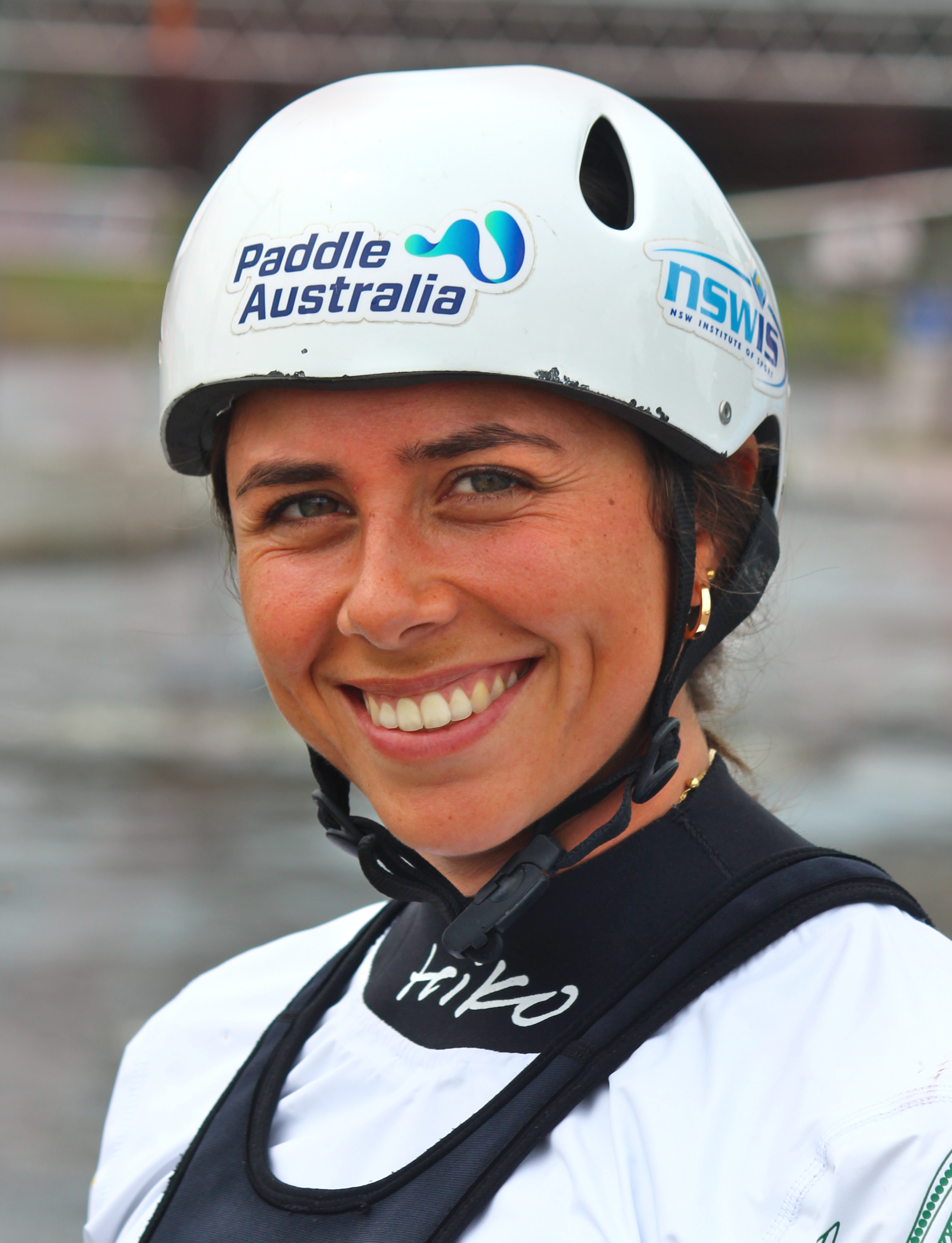
Noemie Fox

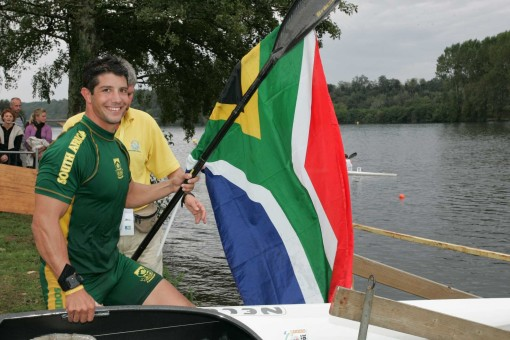
Shaun Rubenstein

- László Fábián, Hungary, sprint canoeist, Olympic champion (K-2 10,000 meter), 4× world champion (3× K-2 10,000 meter and 1× K-4 10,000 meter) and one silver (K-4 10,000 meter)
- Imre Farkas, Hungary, sprint canoeist, 2× Olympic bronze (C-2 1,000 and 10,000 meter)
- **Jessica Fox**, French-born Australian, slalom canoeist, Olympic gold (C-1 slalom), Olympic silver and bronze (K-1 slalom), world championships gold (C-1 and K-1)
- **Noemie Fox**, French-born Australian, slalom canoeist, Olympic champion, 2x world champion
- Myriam Fox-Jerusalmi, France, slalom canoeist, Olympic bronze (K-1 slalom), 5 golds at ICF Canoe Slalom World Championships (2× K-1, 3× K-1 team)
- Klára Fried-Bánfalvi, Hungary, sprint canoeist, Olympic bronze (K-2 500 m), world champion (K-2 500 m)
- Leonid Geishtor, URS (Byelorussia), sprint canoeist, Olympic champion (Canadian pairs 1,000 meter)
- Joe Jacobi, US, slalom canoeist, Olympic champion (C-2 slalom)
- Michael Kolganov, URS (Uzbek)-born Israeli, sprint canoeist, Olympic bronze (K-1 500metre) for Israel; 2× world champion
- Anna Pfeffer, Hungary, sprint canoeist, Olympic 2× silver (K-2 500 m), bronze (K-1 500 m); world champion (K-2 500 m), silver (K-4 500 m), 2× bronze (K-2 500)
- Naum Prokupets, Moldovan/URS, sprint canoeist, Olympic bronze (C-2 1,000me), gold (C-2 10,000m) at ICF Canoe Sprint World Championships
- Leon Rotman, Romanian, sprint canoeist, 2× Olympic champion (C-1 10,000m, C-1 1,000m) and bronze (C-1 1,000m), 14 national titles
- **Shaun Rubenstein**, South Africa, canoeist, World Marathon champion 2006

== Cricket ==
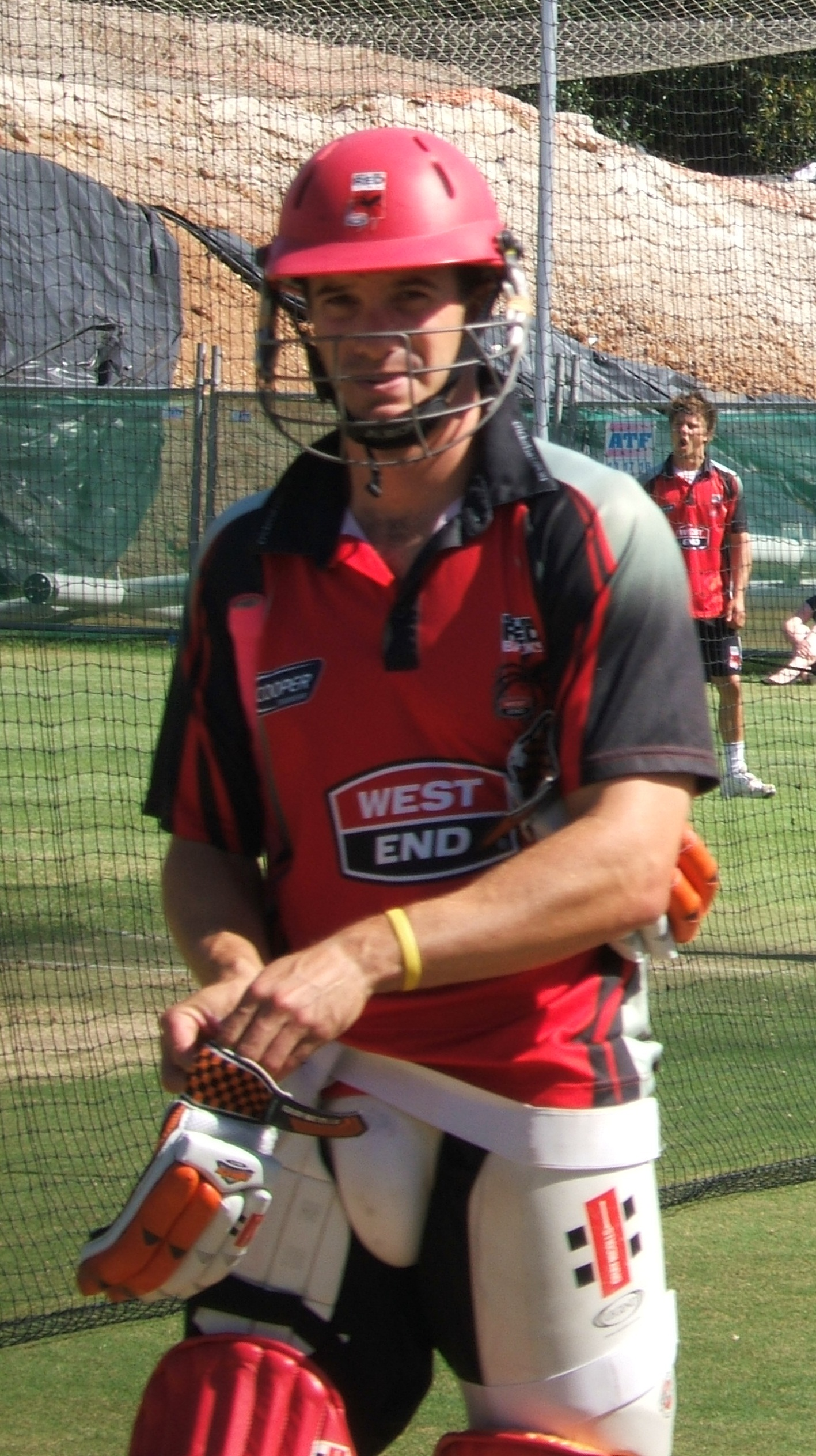
Michael Klinger

- Ben Ashkenazi, Australia (Victorian Bushrangers)
- Ali Bacher, South Africa, batsman and administrator (uncle of Adam Bacher)
- Mike Barnard, England, cricketer
- Ivan Barrow, West Indies, cricketer, only Jew to hit a test century
- Mark Bott, England, cricketer
- Cecil Closenberg, South Africa, cricketer
- Stephen Eskinazi, England, cricketer
- Dennis Gamsy, South Africa, Test wicket-keeper
- Darren Gerard, England, cricketer
- Arthur Goldman, Australia, cricketer
- Norman Gordon, South Africa, fast bowler
- Steven Herzberg, English-born Australian, cricketer
- Sid Kiel, South Africa, opening batsman (Western Province)
- Michael Klinger, Australia, batsman (Western Warriors)
- Roy Levy, Australia, cricketer
- Leonard "Jock" Livingston, Australia, cricketer
- Bev Lyon, England, cricketer
- Dar Lyon, England, cricketer (brother of Bev)
- Greg, Jason, and Lara Molins, two brothers and a cousin from the same Irish family
- Jon Moss, Australia, allrounder (Victorian Bushrangers)
- Sid O'Linn, South Africa
- Ray Phillips, Australia, cricketer
- Terry Racionzer, Scotland, batsman
- John Raphael, England, batsman
- Marshall Rosen, NSW Australia, cricketer and selector
- Lawrence Seeff, South Africa, batsmen
- Maurice Sievers, Australia, lower order batsman and fast-medium bowler
- Bensiyon Songavkar, India, cricketer, MVP of 2009 Maccabiah Games cricket tournament
- Fred Susskind, South Africa, Test batsman
- Julien Wiener, Australia, Test cricketer
- Mandy Yachad, South Africa, Test cricketer

== Curling ==
- Ron Braunstein, Canada, World Champion silver medal
- Terry Braunstein, Canada, World Champion silver medal

== Cycling ==
- Garen Bloch, South Africa, Olympian
- Sean Bloch, South Africa, Olympian
- **Mikhail Iakovlev**, Russian-born Israeli, world record holder
- Romāns Vainšteins, Latvia, 2000 World Road Race Champion
- Tinus van Gelder, Netherlands, 1948 Olympian, Maccabiah Games representative

== Equestrian ==
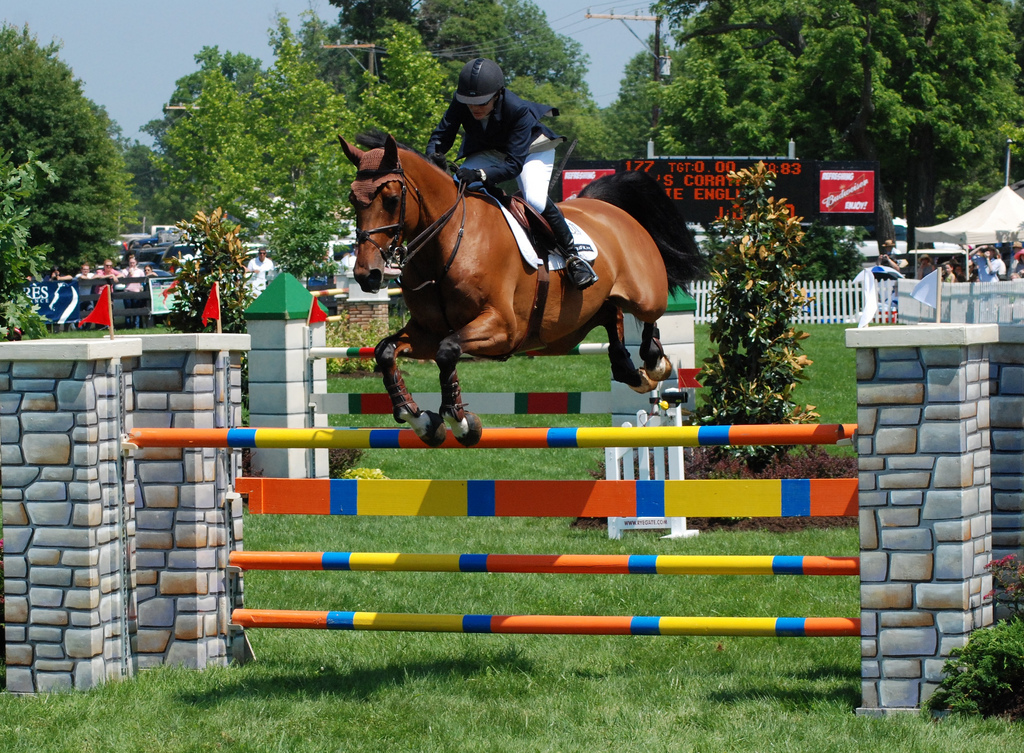
Margie Goldstein-Engle

- **Georgina Bloomberg**, US, Pan-American bronze
- **Robert Dover**, US, 4× Olympic bronze, 1× world championship bronze (dressage)
- **Margie Goldstein-Engle**, US, world championship silver, Pan American Games gold, silver, and bronze (jumping)
- Hermann Mandl, Austria
- Edith Master, US, Olympic bronze (dressage)

== Fencing ==
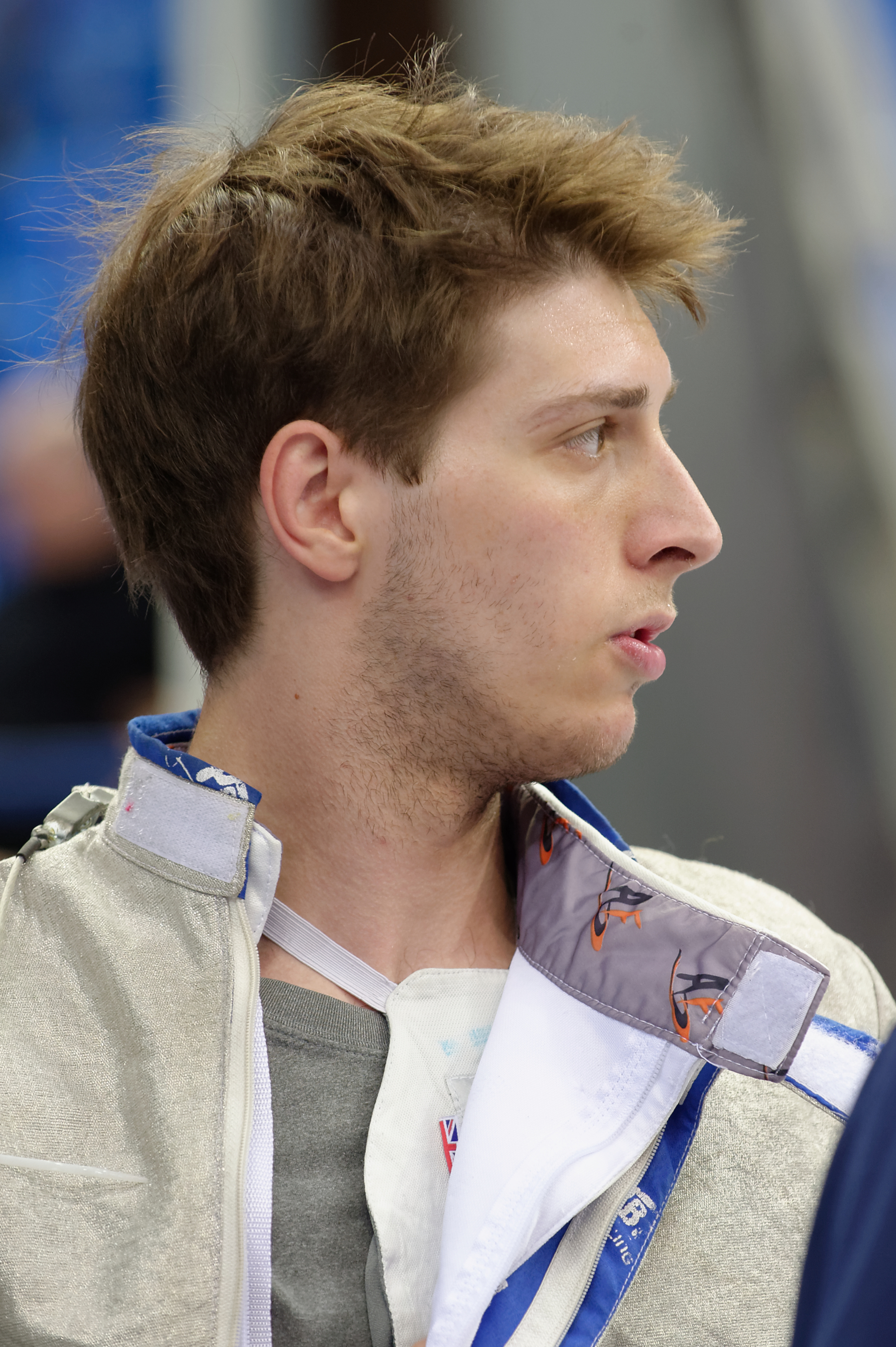
Eli Dershwitz

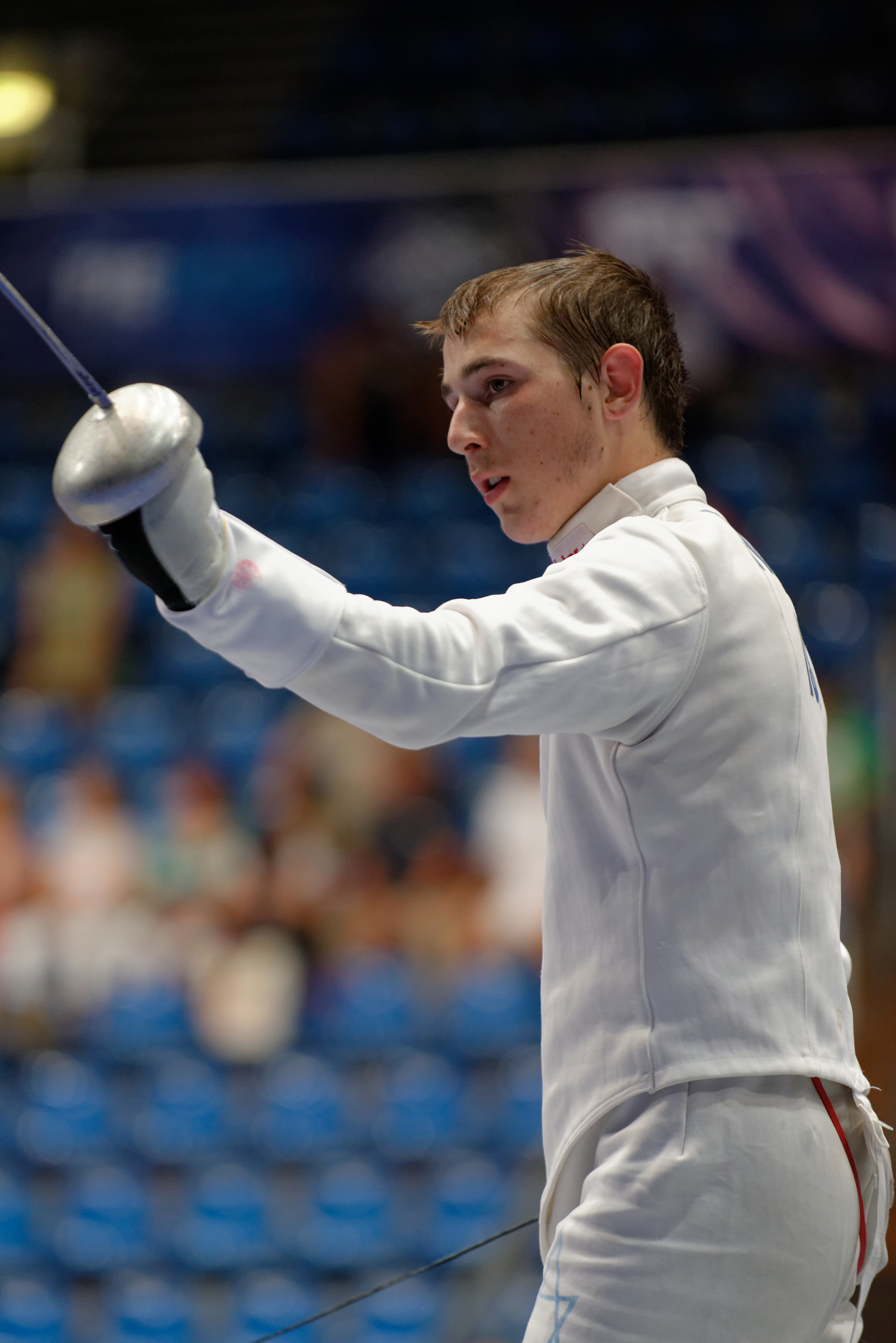
Yuval Freilich

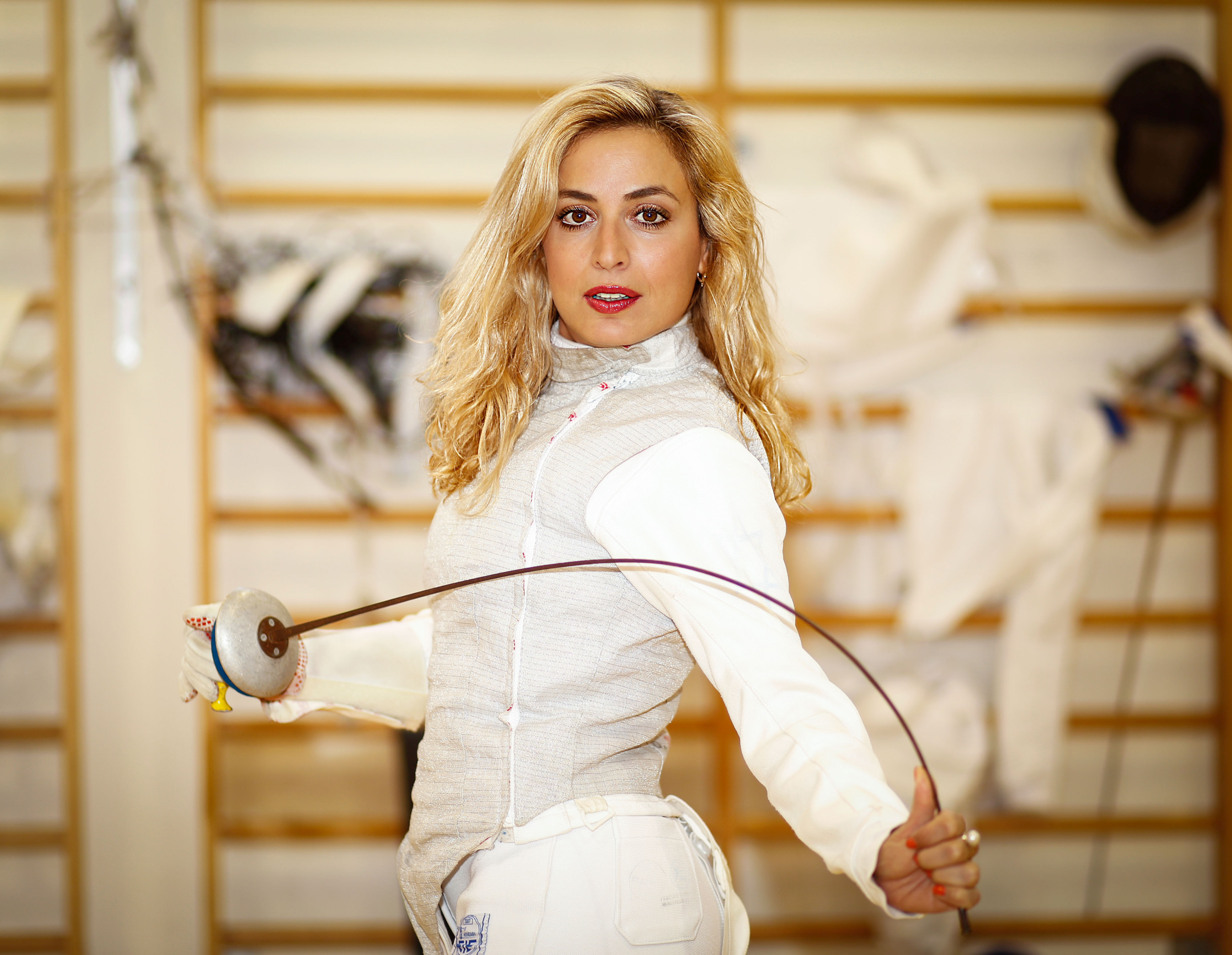
Delila Hatuel

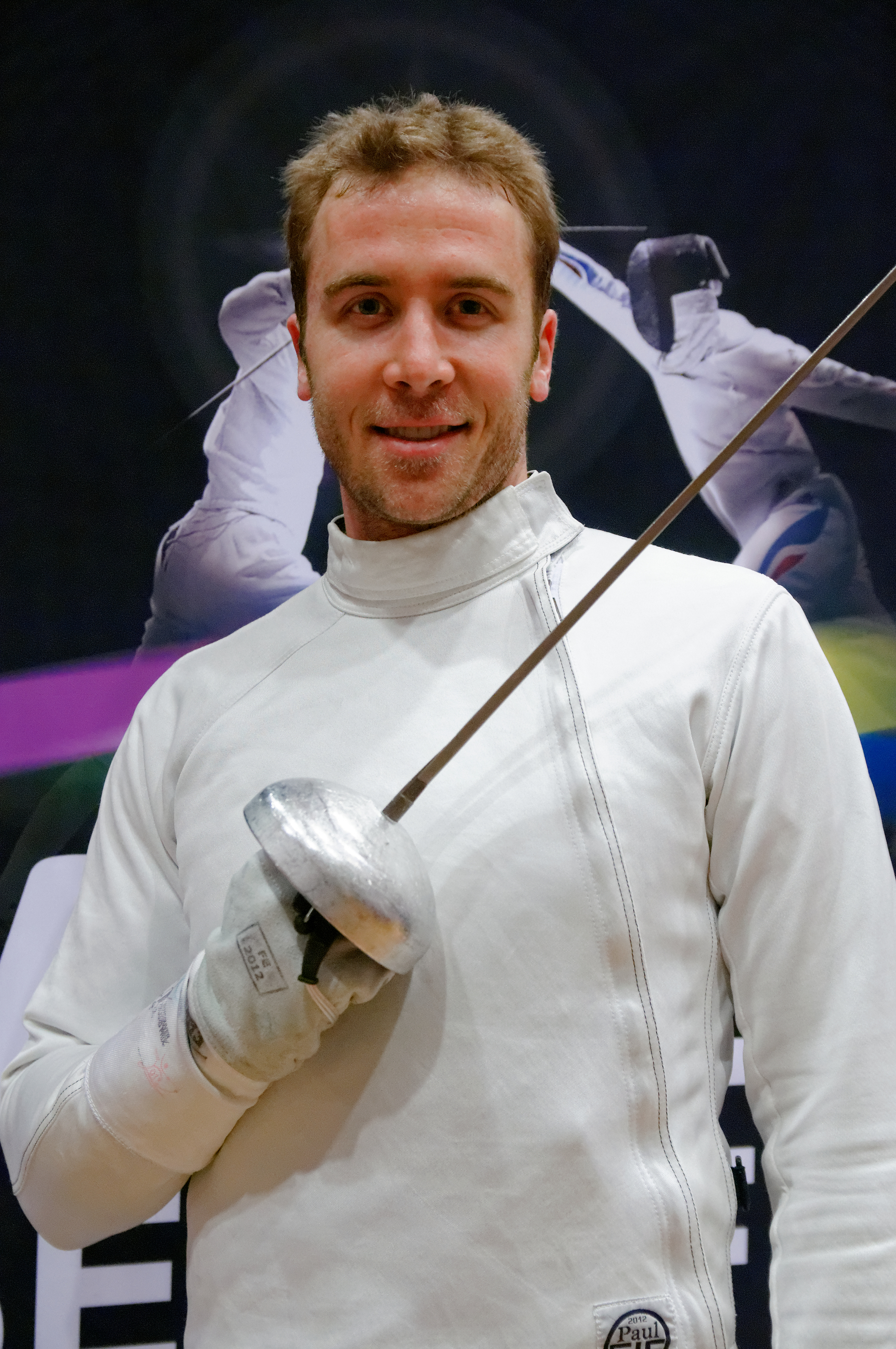
Soren Thompson

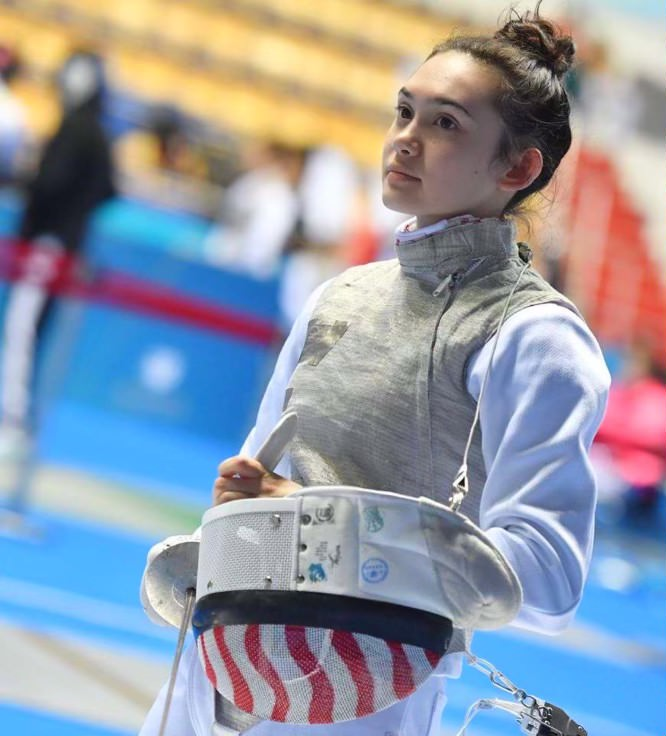
Maia Weintraub

- Henri Anspach, Belgium (épée & foil), Olympic champion
- Paul Anspach, Belgium (épée & foil), 2× Olympic champion
- Norman Armitage (Norman Cohn), US (saber), Olympic bronze, 17× US champion
- Albert "Albie" Axelrod, US (foil), Olympic bronze, 4× US champion
- Péter Bakonyi, Hungary (saber), Olympic 3× bronze
- Tamir Bloom, US (épée), 2× Pan-American silver
- Albert Bogen (Albert Bógathy), Austria (saber), Olympic silver
- Nick Bravin, US (foil), 4x US champion, 3x NCAA champion
- Daniel Bukantz, US (foil), 4× US champion
- **Eli Dershwitz**, US (saber), world champion, junior world champion, 4× Pan-American champion, US champion, NCAA champion
- Yves Dreyfus, France (épée), Olympic bronze, French champion
- **Jacqueline Dubrovich**, US (foil), Olympic team champion
- Ilona Elek, Hungary (saber), 2× Olympic champion
- Boaz Ellis, Israel (foil), 3× NCAA champion, 5× Israeli champion
- Sándor Erdős, Hungary (épée), Olympic champion
- Siegfried "Fritz" Flesch, Austria (saber), Olympic bronze
- Dezső Földes, Hungary (saber), 2× Olympic champion
- **Yuval Freilich**, Israel (épée), 2014 and 2015 European men's épée junior champion, 2019 European épée champion, and the épée team silver medal with Israel at the 2022 European Fencing Championships
- Jenő Fuchs, Hungary (saber), 4× Olympic champion
- Tamás Gábor, Hungary (épée), Olympic champion
- János Garay, Hungary (saber), Olympic champion, silver, bronze, killed by the Nazis
- Oskar Gerde, Hungary (saber), 2× Olympic champion, killed by the Nazis
- Sándor Gombos, Hungary (saber), Olympic champion
- Vadim Gutzeit, Ukraine (saber), Olympic champion
- Johan Harmenberg, Sweden (épée), Olympic champion
- **Delila Hatuel**, Israel (foil), Olympian, ranked No. 9 in world in 2008
- Lydia Hatuel-Czuckermann, Israel (foil), 20× Israeli champion
- Otto Herschmann, Austria (saber), Olympic silver
- **Nick Itkin**, US (foil), Olympic silver, 2x Olympic bronze, individual Pan American champion, 2x individual World Championship medalist
- Emily Jacobson, US (saber), Junior World Champion, NCAA champion
- Sada Jacobson, US (saber), ranked No. 1 in the world, Olympic silver, 2× bronze, 2× world team champion
- Allan Jay, UK (épée & foil), Olympic 2× silver, world champion
- Endre Kabos, Hungary (saber), 3× Olympic champion, bronze
- Roman Kantor, Poland (épée), Nordic champion & URS champion, killed by the Germans during World War II
- Byron Krieger, US (foil, saber, épée), 2× Olympian, Pan American Games team gold/silver
- Grigory Kriss, URS (épée), Olympic champion, 2× silver
- Allan Kwartler, US (saber), 3× Pan American Games champion
- Alexandre Lippmann, France (épée), 2× Olympic champion, 2× silver, bronze
- Helene Mayer, Germany & US (foil), Olympic champion
- Maria Mazina, Russia (épée), Olympic champion, bronze medalist
- Mark Midler, URS (foil), 2× Olympic champion
- Noam Mills, Israel (épée), female Junior World Champion
- Armand Mouyal, France (épée), Olympic bronze, world champion
- Claude Netter, France (foil), Olympic champion, silver
- Jacques Ochs, Belgium (épée), Olympic champion
- Ayelet Ohayon, Israel (foil), European champion
- Ellen Osiier, Denmark (foil), Olympic champion
- Ivan Osiier, Denmark (épée, foil, and saber), Olympic silver (épée), 25× Danish champion
- Attila Petschauer, Hungary (saber), 2× team Olympic champion, silver, killed by the Nazis
- Ellen Preis, Austria (foil), Olympic champion, 3× world champion, 17× Austrian champion
- Mark Rakita, URS (saber), 2× Olympic champion, 2× silver
- Yakov Rylsky, URS (saber), Olympic champion
- Gaston Salmon, Belgium (épée), Olympic champion
- Zoltán Ozoray Schenker, Hungary (saber & foil), Olympic champion, silver, bronze
- Edgar Seligman, British (épée, foil, and saber), Olympic 2× silver (épée), 2× British champion in each weapon
- Sergey Sharikov, Russia (saber), 2× Olympic champion, silver, bronze
- Andre Spitzer, Israel, killed by terrorists
- Jean Stern, France (épée), Olympic champion
- **Elizabeth Tartakovsky**, US (sabre), Olympian and Pan-American champion
- **Soren Thompson**, US (épée), World Team Champion, US Junior Champion, US champion, NCAA champion
- David Tyshler, URS (saber), Olympic bronze
- Ildikó Újlaky-Rejtő, Hungary (foil), 2× Olympic champion
- Eduard Vinokurov, Russia (saber), 2× Olympic champion, silver
- Iosif Vitebskiy, URS (épée), Olympic silver, 10× national champion
- **Maia Weintraub**, US (foil), Olympic team champion, 2x US national champion (2019 & 2023), 2022 NCAA individual foil champion, 2021 junior team silver, 2022 junior team gold, 2023 senior team silver, 3× gold 2019 European Maccabi Games
- Lajos Werkner, Hungary (saber), 2× Olympic champion
- George Worth, US (saber), Olympic bronze, US champion, 3× Pan American champion

== Field hockey ==
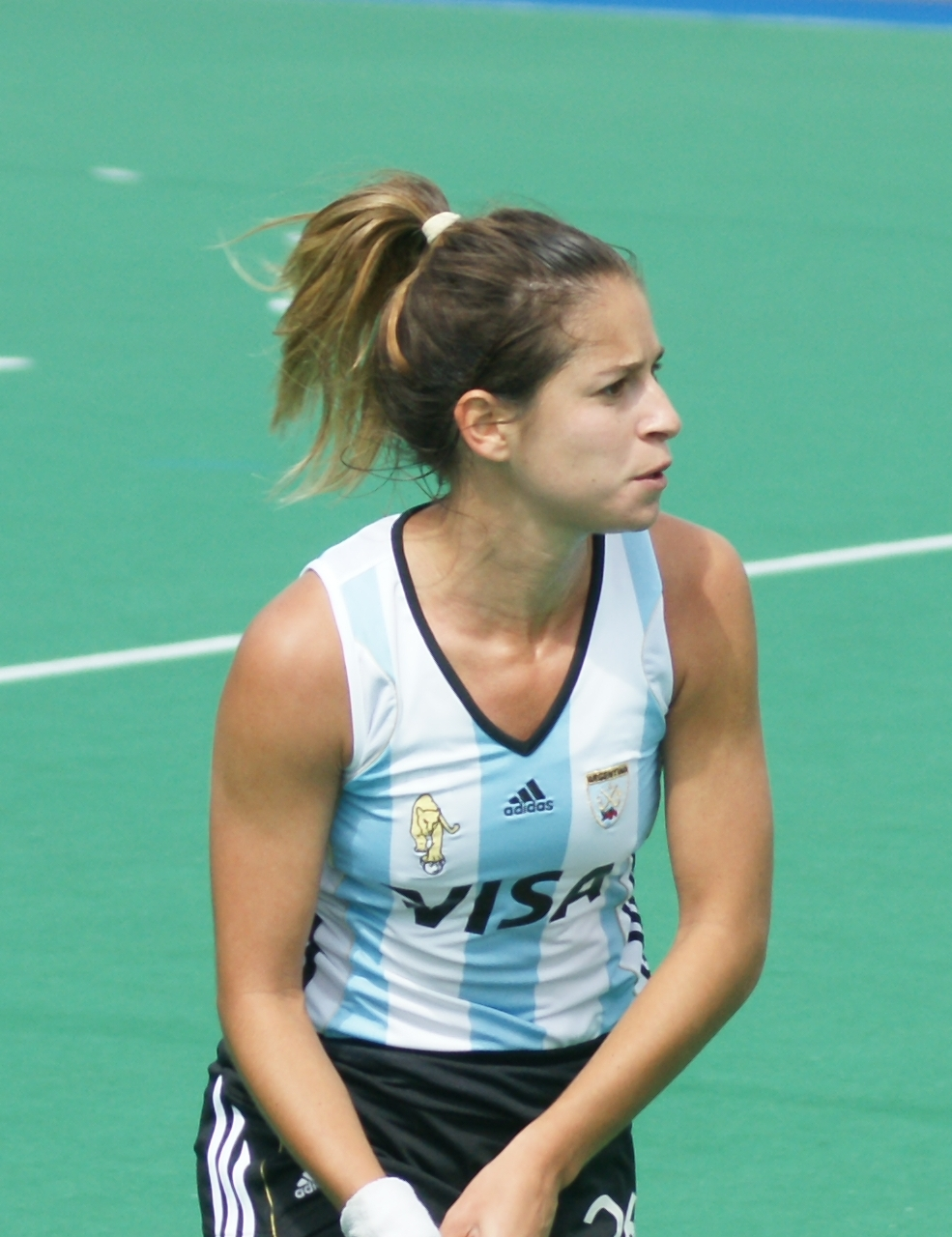
Giselle Kañevsky

- Carina Benninga, Netherlands, Olympic champion, bronze
- Giselle Kañevsky, Argentina, Olympic bronze

== Figure skating ==
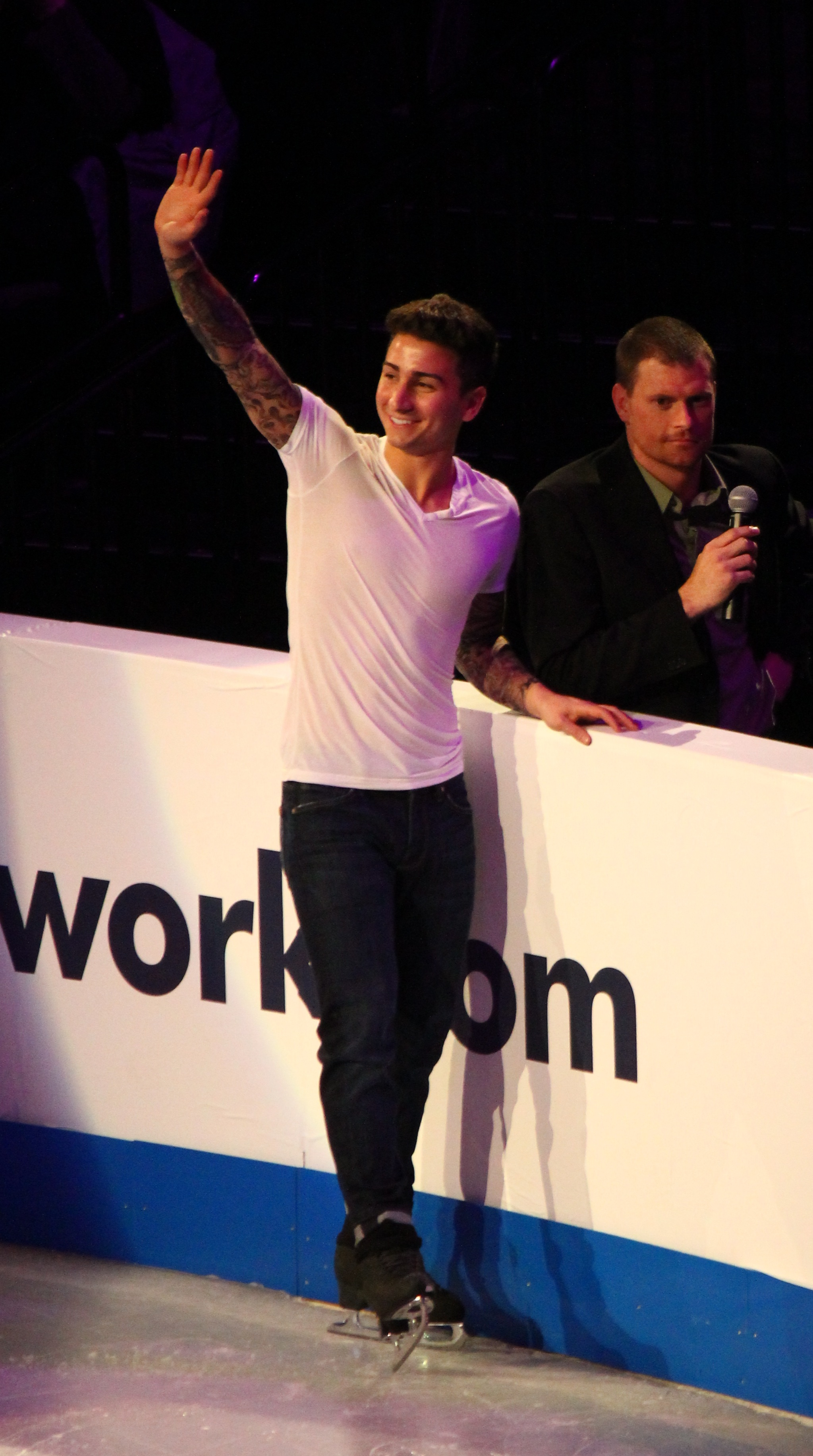
Max Aaron

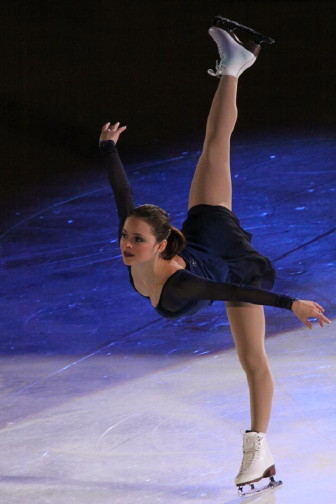
Sasha Cohen

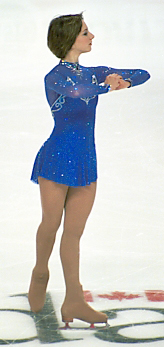
Sarah Hughes

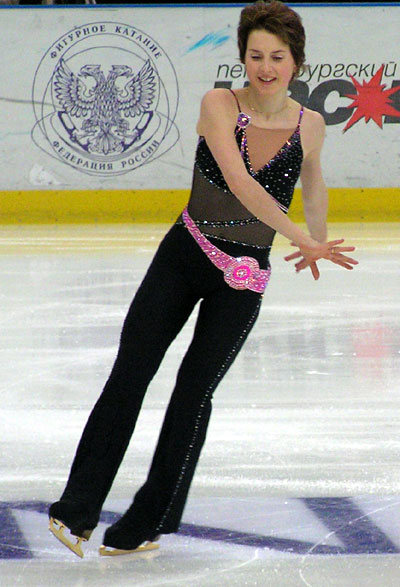
Irina Slutskaya

- Max Aaron, US, figure skater, 2013 US men's champion
- Sarah Abitbol, France, figure skater, World Figure Skating Championship bronze
- Benjamin Agosto, US, ice dancer, Olympic silver, world championship silver, bronze
- Ilya Averbukh, Russia, ice dancer, Olympic silver, world champion, European champion
- Oksana Baiul, Ukraine, figure skater, Olympic gold
- Alexei Beletski, Ukrainian-born Israeli, ice dancer, Olympian
- Judy Blumberg, US, ice dancer, 3× World Championship bronze
- Cindy Bortz, US, figure skater, world junior champion
- **Jason Brown**, US, figure skater, 2× Junior World medalist, 2014 US silver, 2014 Olympic bronze (team)
- **Aimee Buchanan**, US & Israel, figure skater
- Fritzi Burger, Austria, figure skater, 2× Olympic silver, 2× world championship silver
- Zhan Bush, Russia, figure skater
- **Oleksii Bychenko**, Ukrainian-born Israeli, figure skater, 2016 European silver medallist, Olympian
- Alain Calmat, France, figure skater, Olympic silver, world championship gold, silver, 2× bronze
- Galit Chait, Israel, ice dancer, world championship bronze, Olympian
- Sasha Cohen, US, figure skater, 2006 US Champion, 3× World medalist, 2006 Olympic silver
- Amber Corwin, US, figure skater
- Natalia Dubova, Russia/URS, ice dancer
- Loren Galler-Rabinowitz, US, ice dancer, competes with partner David Mitchell; US Championships bronze
- Aleksandr Gorelik, URS, pair skater, Olympic silver, world championship 2× silver, bronze
- Melissa Gregory, US, figure skater, ice dancer with Denis Petukhov, US Championships 3 silvers, 2 bronze
- Natalia Gudina, Ukrainian-born Israeli, figure skater, Olympian
- Emily Hughes, US, figure skater, World Junior Figure Skating Championships bronze, US Championships bronze, silver
- Sarah Hughes, US, figure skater, Olympic gold, world championship bronze
- Ronald Joseph, US, figure skater, US Junior Champion, US Championships gold, 2× silver, and bronze, world championship silver, bronze, 1964 Olympic bronze
- Vivian Joseph, US, figure skater, US Junior Champion, US Championships gold, 2× silver, and bronze, world championship silver, bronze, 1964 Olympic bronze
- Gennadi Karponossov, Russia, ice dancer & coach, Olympic gold, world championship 2× gold, silver, 2× bronze
- Felix Kaspar, Austria, figure skater, Olympic bronze
- **Tamar Katz**, US-born Israeli, figure skater
- **Evgeni Krasnopolski**, Ukraine-born Israel, Olympian
- Lily Kronberger, Hungary, figure skater, world championship 4× gold, 2× bronze, World Figure Skating Hall of Fame
- Dylan Moscovitch, Canada, pairs skater, 2011 Canadian national champion, 2014 Olympic silver (team)
- Emilia Rotter, Hungary, pair skater, world championship 4× gold, silver, 2× Olympic bronze
- Louis Rubenstein, Canada, figure skater (pre-Olympic) world champion, World Figure Skating Hall of Fame
- Lionel Rumi, Israel, ice dancer
- Sergei Sakhnovsky, Israel, ice dancer with Galit Chait, world championship bronze, Olympian
- **Daniel Samohin**, Israel, figure skater, 2016 World Junior Champion; former junior world record holder (free skate), Olympian
- Michael Seibert, US, ice dancer, US Figure Skating Championships 5× gold, World Figure Skating Championships 3× bronze
- Robert Shmalo, US, ice dancer
- Julia Shapiro, Russia-born Israel, pair skater, World Junior bronze
- Michael Shmerkin, URS-born Israeli, figure skater
- Simon Shnapir, Russian-born US, pairs skater, 2× US national champion (2013 & 2014), 2014 Olympic bronze (team)
- Igor Shpilband, URS, ice dancer, world junior championship gold, silver; coach to several world champion teams
- Jamie Silverstein, US, figure skater, ice dancer with Ryan O'Meara, US Championships bronze
- Irina Slutskaya, Russia, figure skater, Olympic silver & bronze, world championship 2× gold, 3× silver & 1× bronze, 4× Russian champion, 7× European champion
- Maxim Staviski, Russian-born Bulgarian, ice dancer, world championship gold, silver, bronze
- László Szollás, Hungary, pair skater, world championship gold & silver, 2× Olympic bronze
- **Isabella Tobias**, US-born Israeli ice dancer, represented Lithuania at 2014 Winter Olympics, currently representing Israel
- Alexandra Zaretski, Belarusian-born Israeli, ice dancer, Olympian
- Roman Zaretski, Belarusian-born Israeli, ice dancer, Olympian

== Golf ==
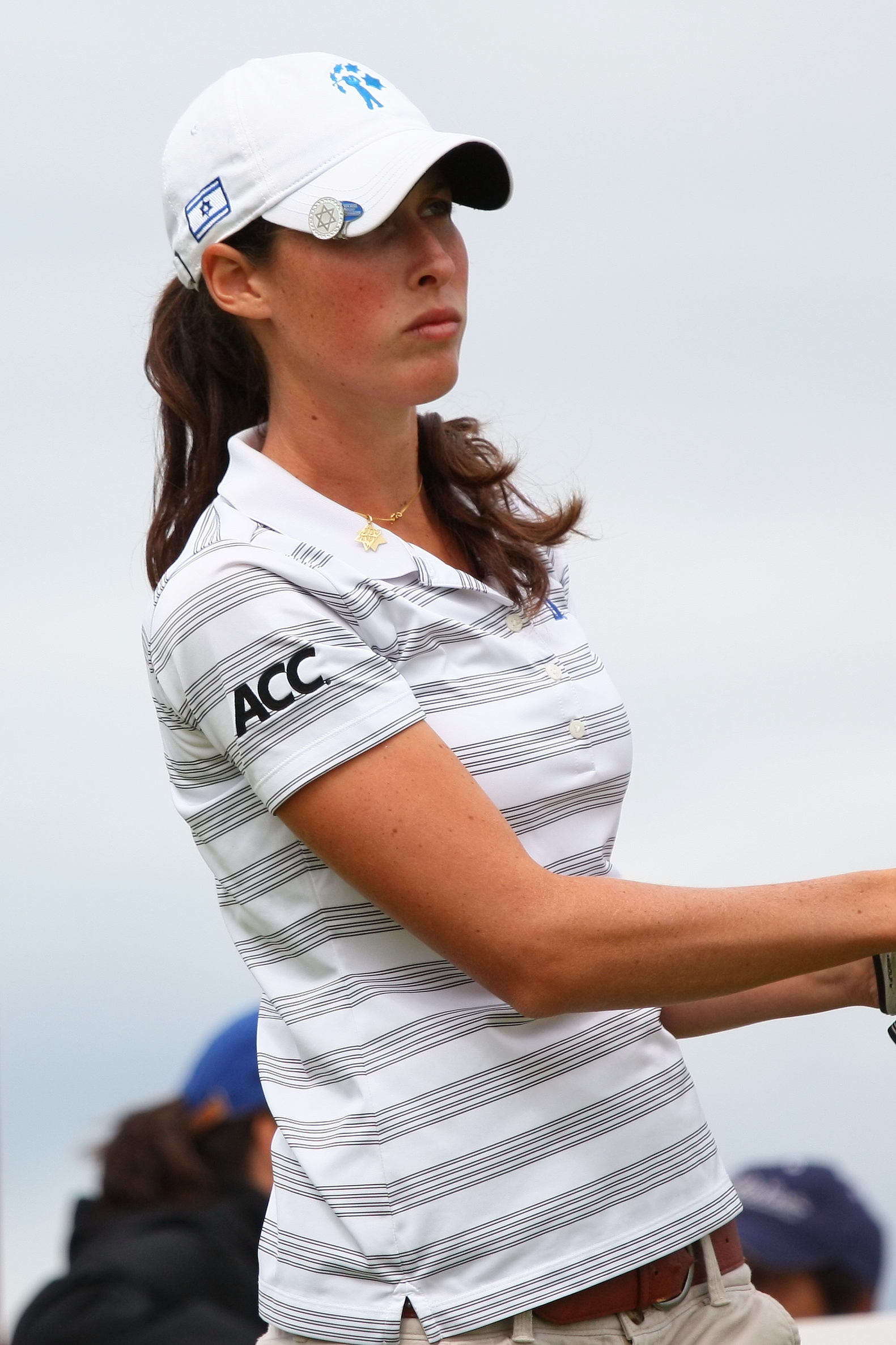
Laetitia Beck

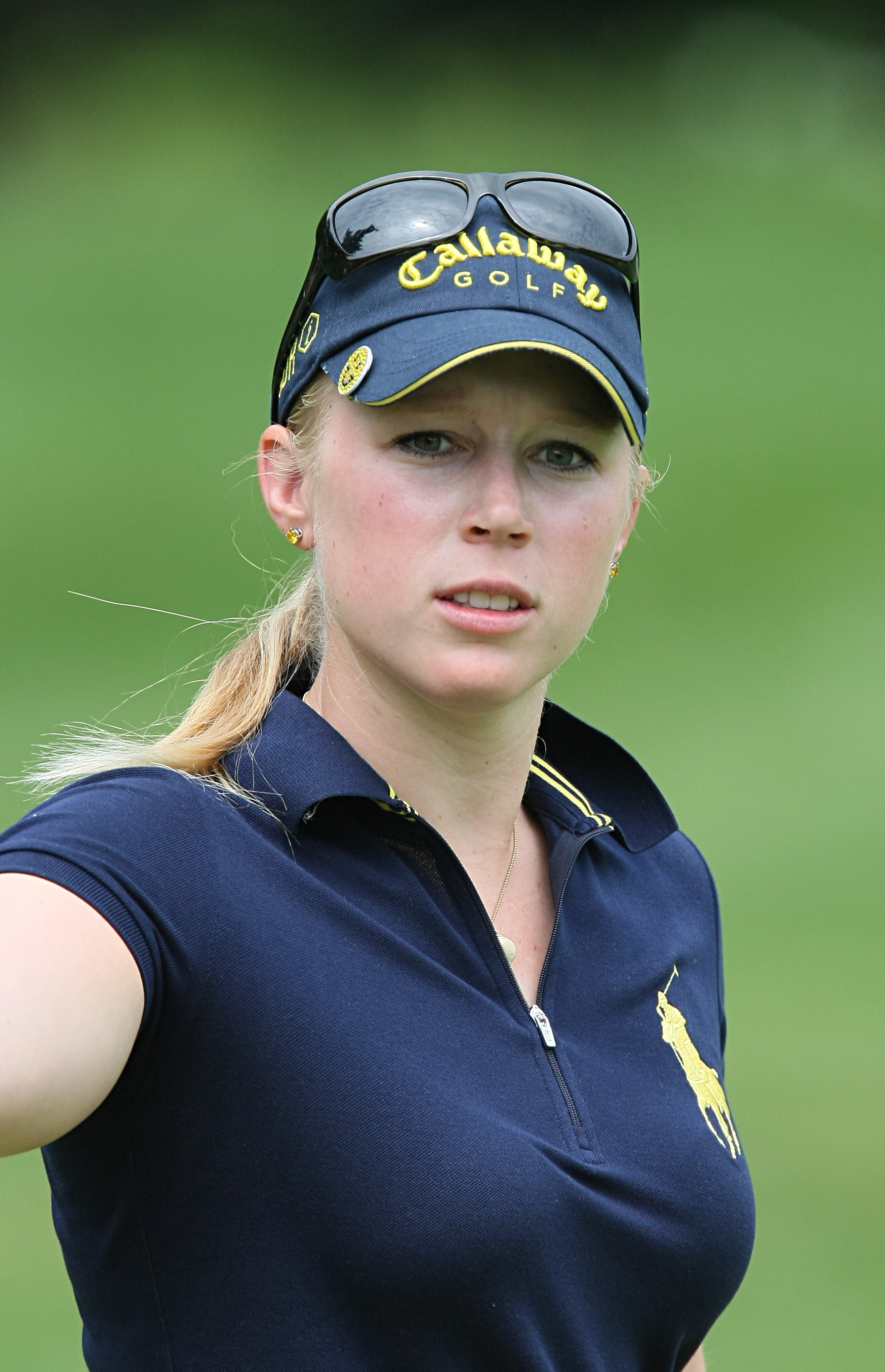
Morgan Pressel

- Amy Alcott, US, LPGA Tour, World Golf Hall of Fame
- Herman Barron, US, PGA Tour
- **Laetitia Beck**, Israel, Israeli champion & 3× Maccabiah Games gold, LPGA Tour
- **Daniel Berger**, US, PGA Tour
- Erica Blasberg, US, LPGA Tour
- Bruce Fleisher, US, PGA Tour
- Paul Friedlander, Eswatini, Sunshine Tour
- **Max Greyserman**, US, PGA Tour
- **Max Homa**, US, 2013 NCAA Division I Men's Golf Champion, PGA Tour
- **Jonathan Kaye**, US, PGA Tour
- **Skip Kendall**, US, Champions Tour
- **Alexander Lévy**, France, European Tour
- **David Lipsky**, US, Asian Tour
- **Sam Little**, England, European Tour
- **David Merkow**, US, Northwestern University, 2006 Big Ten Golfer of the Year
- **Rob Oppenheim**, US, PGA Tour
- **Corey Pavin**, US, PGA Tour and Champions Tour (converted to Christianity)
- **Morgan Pressel**, US, LPGA Tour
- **Monte Scheinblum**, US, 1992 US & World Long Drive Champion
- Zohar Sharon, Israel
- Tony Sills, US, PGA Tour
- **Ben Silverman**, Canada, PGA Tour

== Gymnastics ==
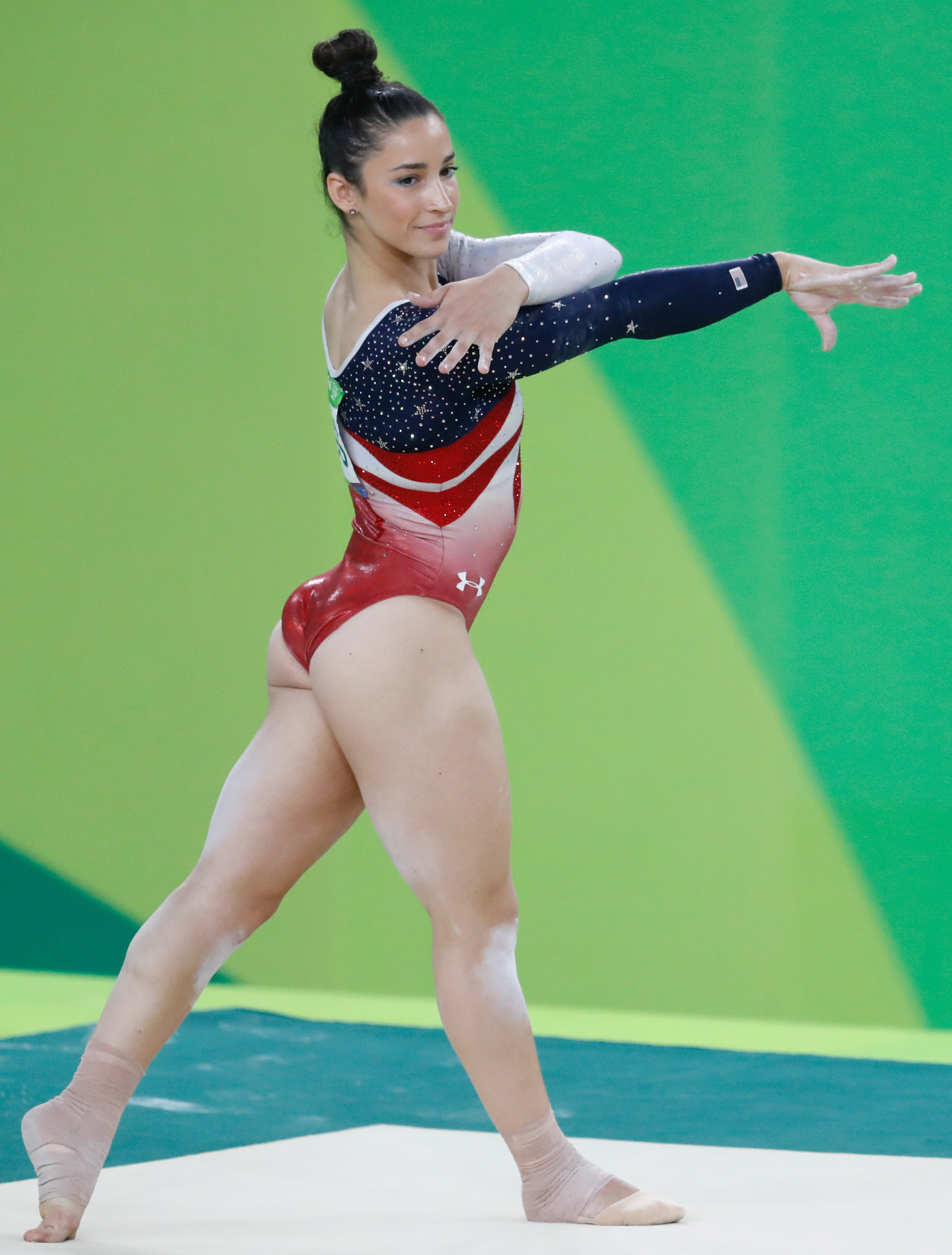
Aly Raisman

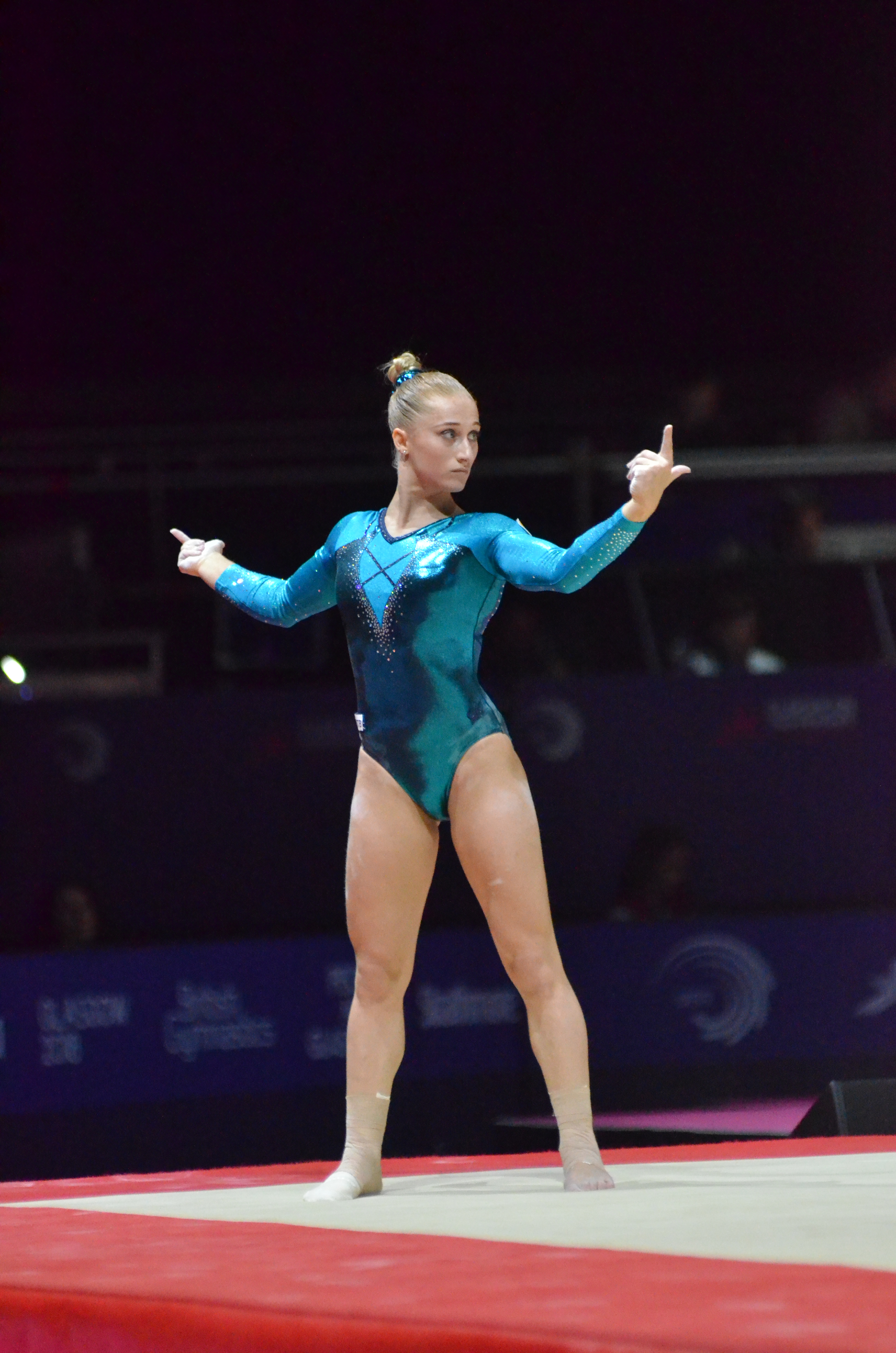
Lilia Akhaimova

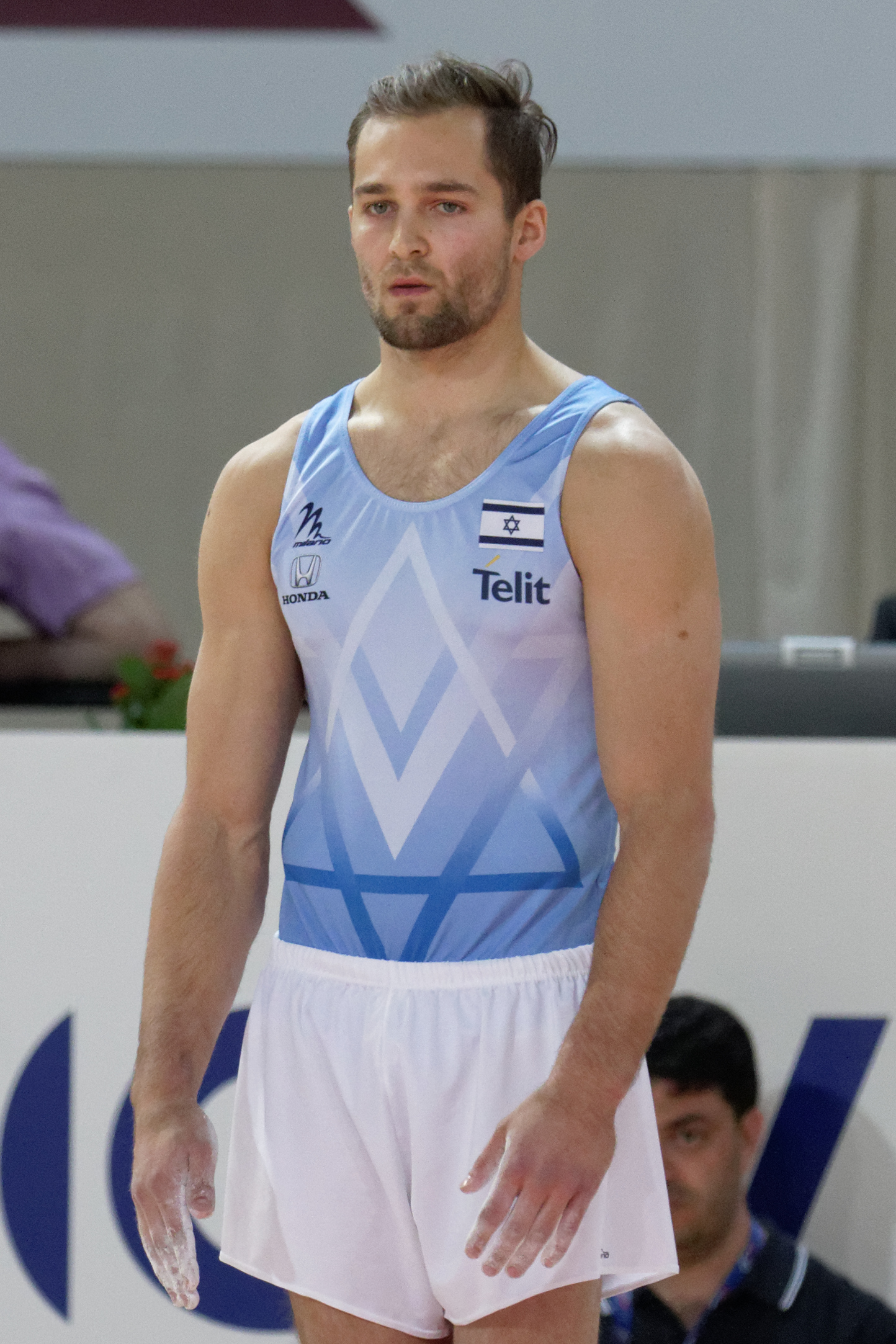
Alexander Shatilov

- Ruth Abeles, Israel, Olympian (artistic gymnast)
- Estella Agsteribbe, Netherlands, Olympic champion (team combined exercises), killed by the Nazis in Auschwitz
- **Lilia Akhaimova**, Russia, Olympic gold artistic (team all-around) gymnast at the 2020 Summer Olympics
- Linoy Ashram, Israel, Olympic gold (rhythmic gymnast) and 6× World Championships silver
- **Daria Atamanov**, Israel, Olympian, European Champion and World medalist (rhythmic gymnast)
- **Shani Bakanov**, Israel, 2x World Championships gold
- **Eliza Banchuk**, Israel, 2x World Championships gold
- Yana Batyrshina, Russia, Olympic silver (rhythmic gymnast)
- Alyssa Beckerman, US, national champion (balance beam), 2 silver & bronze (uneven bars)
- Valery Belenky, URS/Azerbaijan/Germany, Olympic champion (team combined exercises), bronze (individual combined exercises)
- Ralli Ben-Yehuda, Israel, Olympian (artistic gymnast)
- Moran Buzovski, Israel, Olympian (rhythmic gymnast)
- Elka de Levie, Netherlands, Olympic champion (team combined exercises)
- Abraham de Oliveira, Netherlands, Olympian (artistic gymnast)
- **Artem Dolgopyat**, Ukrainian-born Israeli, Olympic gold and silver (artistic gymnast – floor) for Israel
- Olena Dvornichenko, Israel/Ukraine, rhythmic gymnastics
- Philip Erenberg, US, Olympic silver (Indian clubs)
- Alfred Flatow, Germany, 3× Olympic champion (parallel bars, team parallel bars, team horizontal bar), silver (horizontal bar)
- Gustav Felix Flatow, Germany, 2× Olympic champion (team parallel bars, team horizontal bar)
- Samu Fóti, Hungary, Olympic silver (team combined exercises)
- Limor Friedman, Israel, Olympian (artistic gymnast)
- **Adar Friedmann**, Israel, 2x World Championships gold
- Mitch Gaylord, US, Olympic champion (team), silver (vaulting), 2× bronze (rings, parallel bars)
- Imre Gellért, Hungary, Olympic silver (team combined exercises)
- Brian Ginsberg, US, 2x Pan-American champion
- Nancy Goldsmith, Israel, Olympian (artistic gymnast)
- Maria Gorokhovskaya, Russia/URS, Olympic 2× champion (all-around individual exercises, team combined exercises), 5× silver (vault, asymmetrical bars, balance beam, floor exercise, team exercises with portable apparatus)
- Abie Grossfeld, US, 8× Pan American champion, 7× Maccabiah champion, coach
- George Gulack, US, Olympic champion (flying rings)
- Miriam Kara, Israel, Olympian (artistic gymnast)
- Ágnes Keleti, Hungary, 5× Olympic champion (2× floor exercise, asymmetrical bars, floor exercise, balance beam, team exercise with portable apparatus), 3× silver (2× team combined exercises, individual combined exercises), 2× bronze (asymmetrical bars, team exercises with portable apparatus), International Gymnastics Hall of Fame
- Alice Kertész, Hungary, Olympic champion (team, portable apparatus), silver (team); world silver (team)
- **Alexandra Kiroi-Bogatyreva**, Australia, Olympian, Commonwealth Games clubs champion, rhythmic gymnast
- Natalia Laschenova, Russia/URS, Olympic champion (team)
- Ya'akov Levi, Israel, Olympian (artistic gymnast)
- Tatiana Lysenko, URS/Ukraine, 2× Olympic champion (balance beam, team combined exercises), bronze (horse vault)
- Valeria Maksyuta, Ukraine/Israel, multiple World Cup medalist, Israeli Olympian, Maccabiah Games champion
- Phoebe Mills, US, Olympic bronze (balance beam)
- Abraham Mok, Netherlands
- Yohanan Moyal, Israel, Olympian (artistic gymnast)
- Helena Nordheim, Netherlands, Olympic champion (team combined exercises), killed by the Nazis in Sobibór
- Mikhail Perelman, URS, Olympic champion (team combined exercises)
- Katerina Pisetsky, Israel/Ukraine, rhythmic gymnast
- Anna Polak, Netherlands, Olympic champion (team combined exercises), killed by the Nazis in Sobibór
- Vladimir Portnoi, URS, Olympic silver (team combined exercises) and bronze (long horse vault)
- Aly Raisman, US, Olympic champion (artistic gymnast; floor 2012, team combined exercises: 2012, 2016), silver (all-around, floor: 2016), bronze (balance beam); world gold (team: 2011, 2015), silver (team: 2010), and bronze (floor exercise: 2011)
- Yulia Raskina, Belarus, Olympic silver (rhythmic gymnastics)
- **Lihie Raz**, US/Israel, European Championship bronze (floor), Olympian artistic gymnast for Israel
- Irina Risenzon, Hungary-born Israel, Olympian (rhythmic gymnast)
- Neta Rivkin, Israel, world bronze (rhythmic gymnastics; hoop)
- **Monica Rokhman**, US, Olympian (rhythmic gymnast)
- Maria Savenkov, Israel/Russia, rhythmic gymnast
- Samantha Shapiro, US, 2x Pan-American champion (artistic gymnast)
- **Alexander Shatilov**, Uzbekistan/Israel, world bronze, European champion (artistic gymnast; floor exercise)
- Yelena Shushunova, Russia/URS, Olympic 2× champion (all-around, team), silver (balance beam), bronze (uneven bars)
- Judijke Simons, Netherlands, Olympic champion (team combined exercises), killed by the Nazis in Sobibór
- Samantha Smith, Canada, Olympian (trampoline)
- Kerri Strug, US, Olympic champion (team combined exercises), bronze (team combined exercises)
- Victoria Veinberg Filanovsky, Russia/Israel, youth Olympian (rhythmic gymnast) for Israel
- Rahel Vigdozchik, Israel, rhythmic gymnast
- Veronika Vitenberg, Israel/Belarus, rhythmic gymnast
- Julie Zetlin, US, 2010 US champion, rhythmic gymnastics
- Valerie Zimring, US, 1984 US National Champion, 5× Maccabiah Champion (rhythmic gymnastics)

== Horse racing ==
- Georges Stern, France
- Sam Waley-Cohen, Britain, National Hunt jockey; winner of the Cheltenham Gold Cup, Grand National, and King George VI Chase

== Ice hockey ==
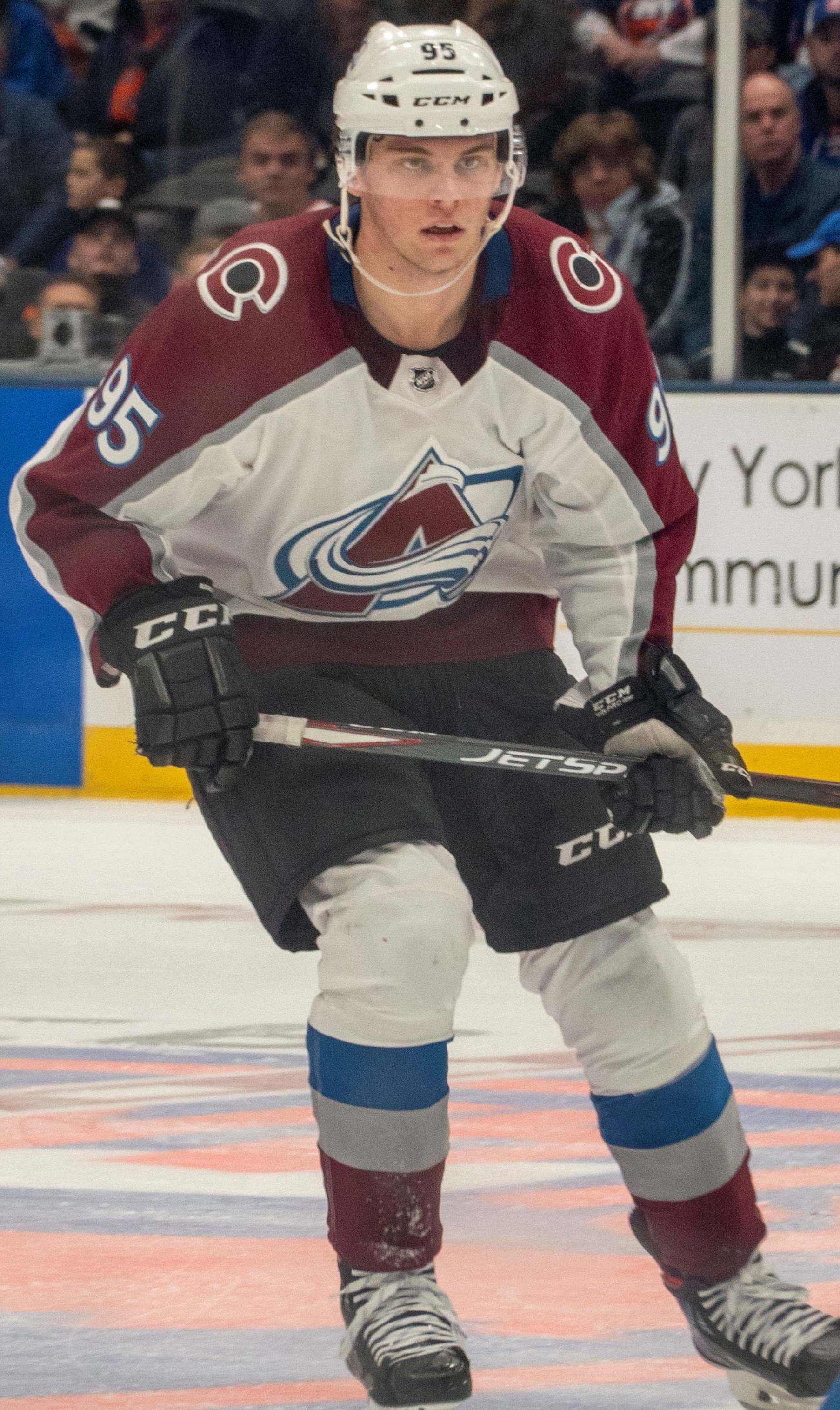
André Burakovsky

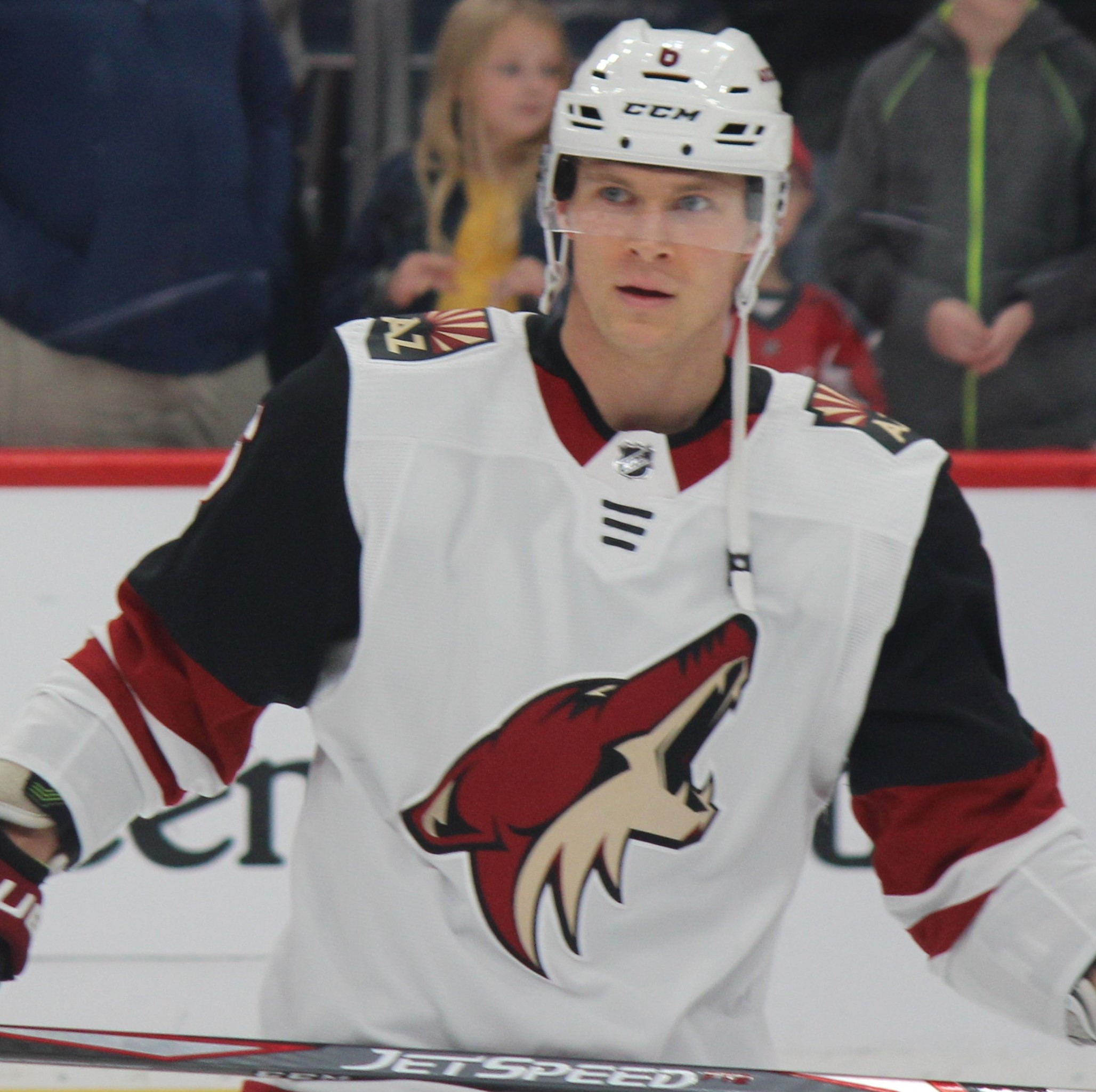
Jakob Chychrun

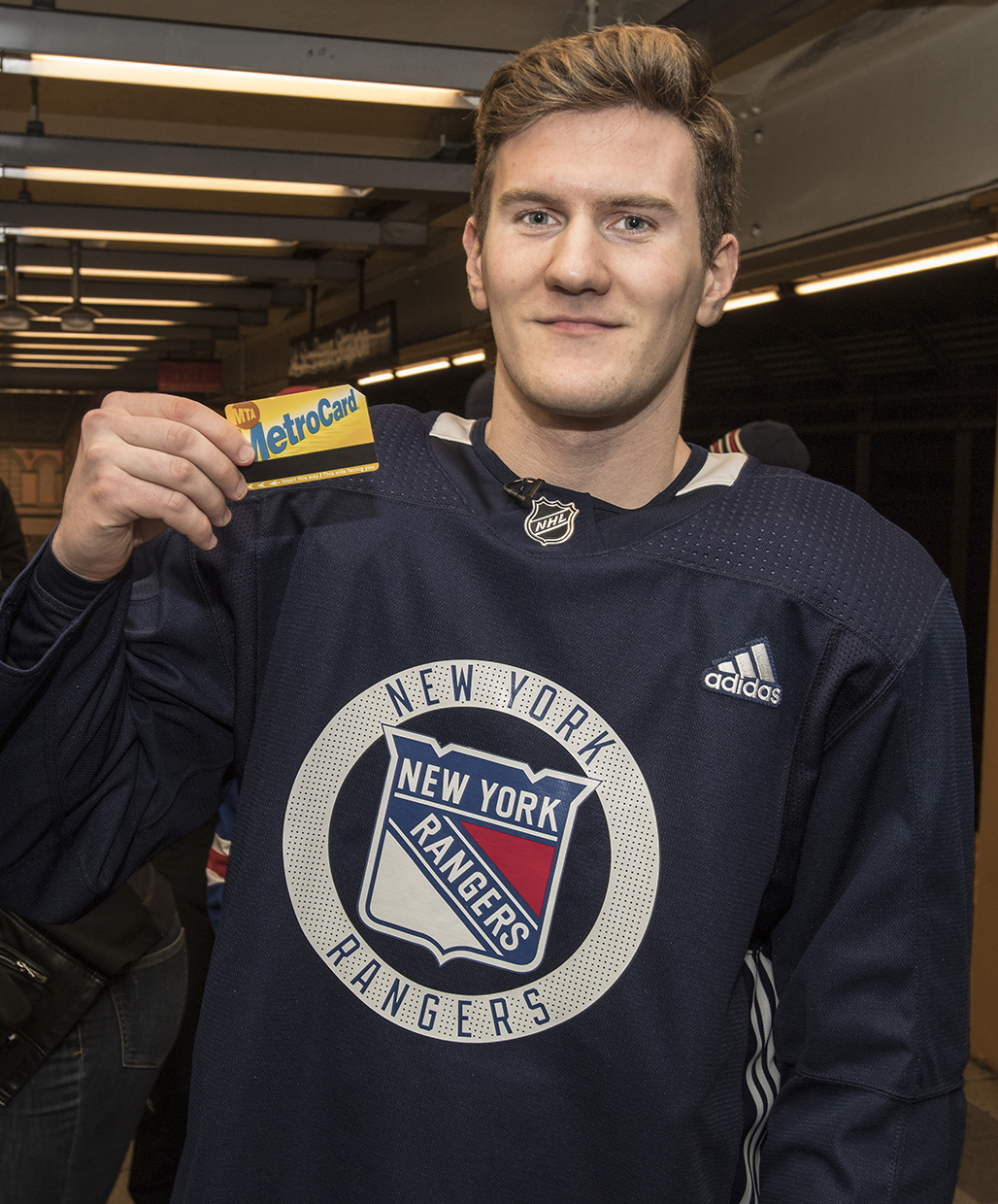
Adam Fox

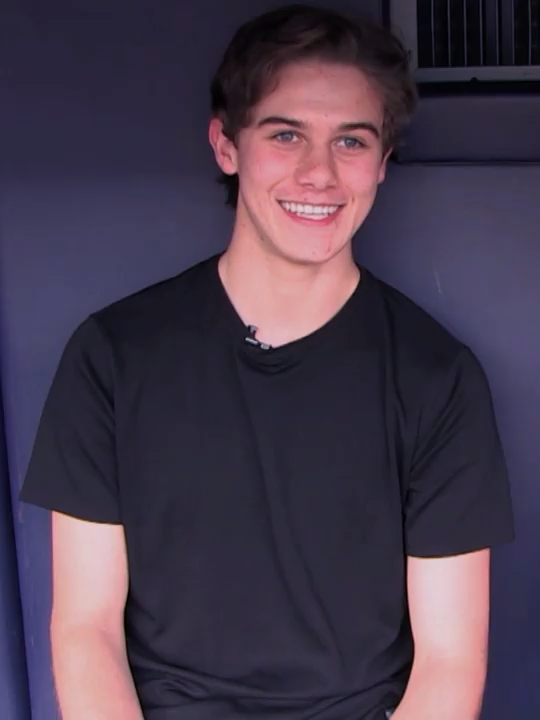
Jack Hughes

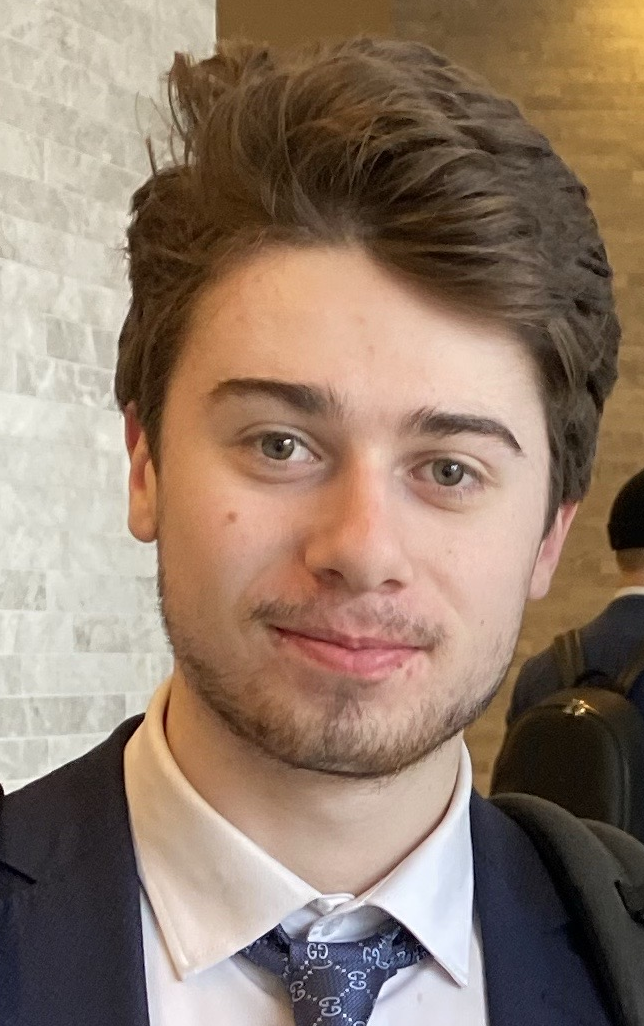
Quinn Hughes

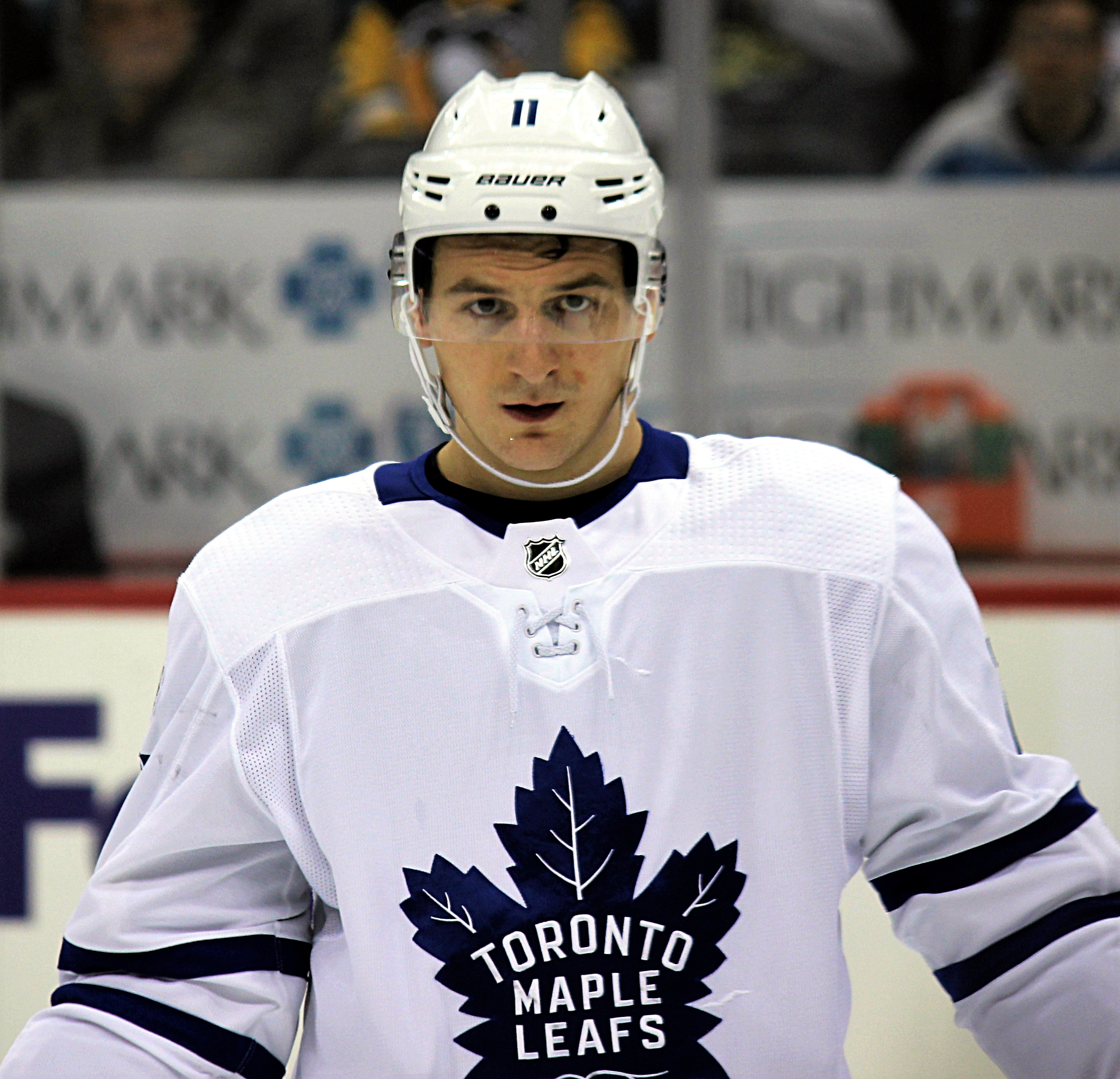
Zach Hyman

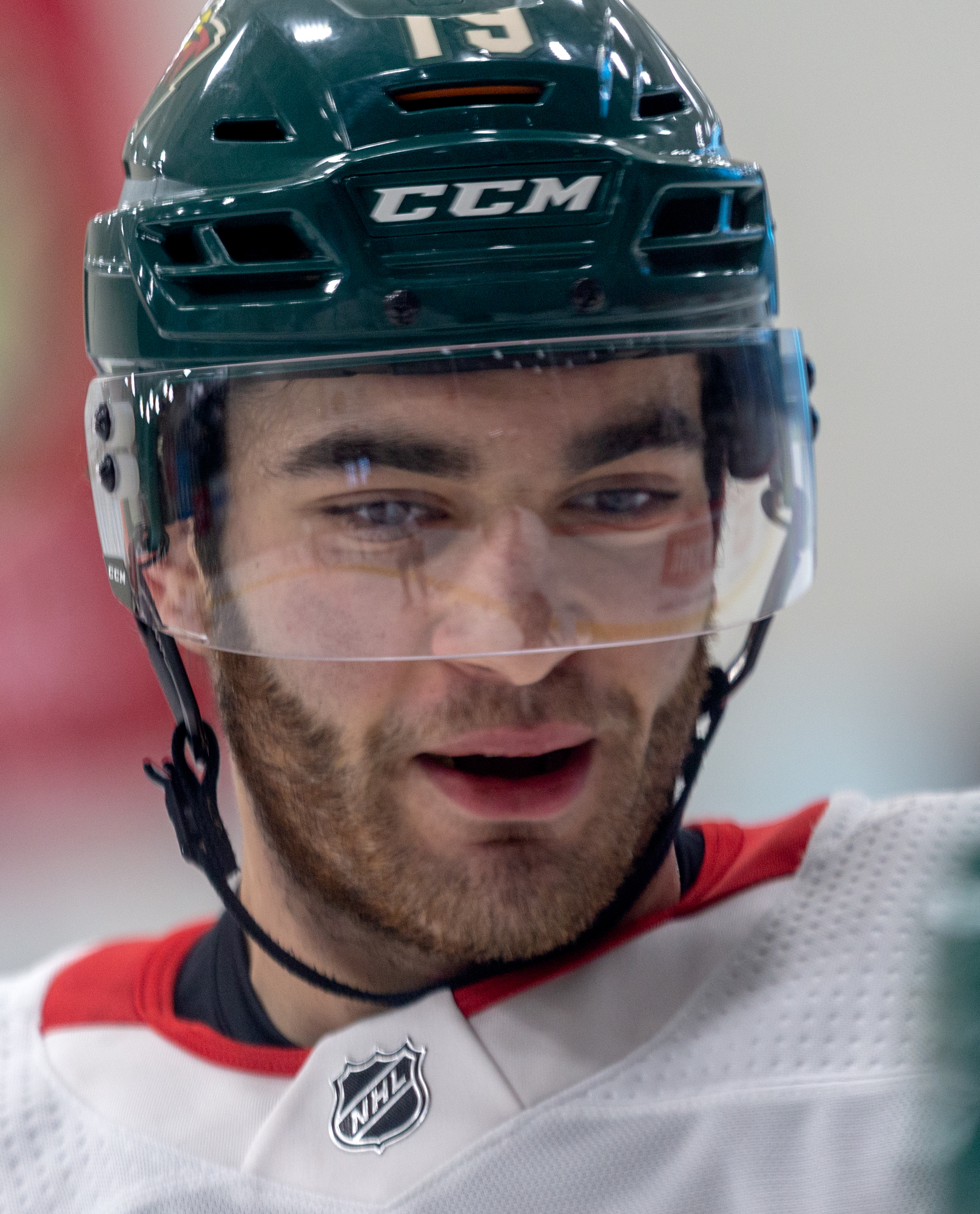
Luke Kunin

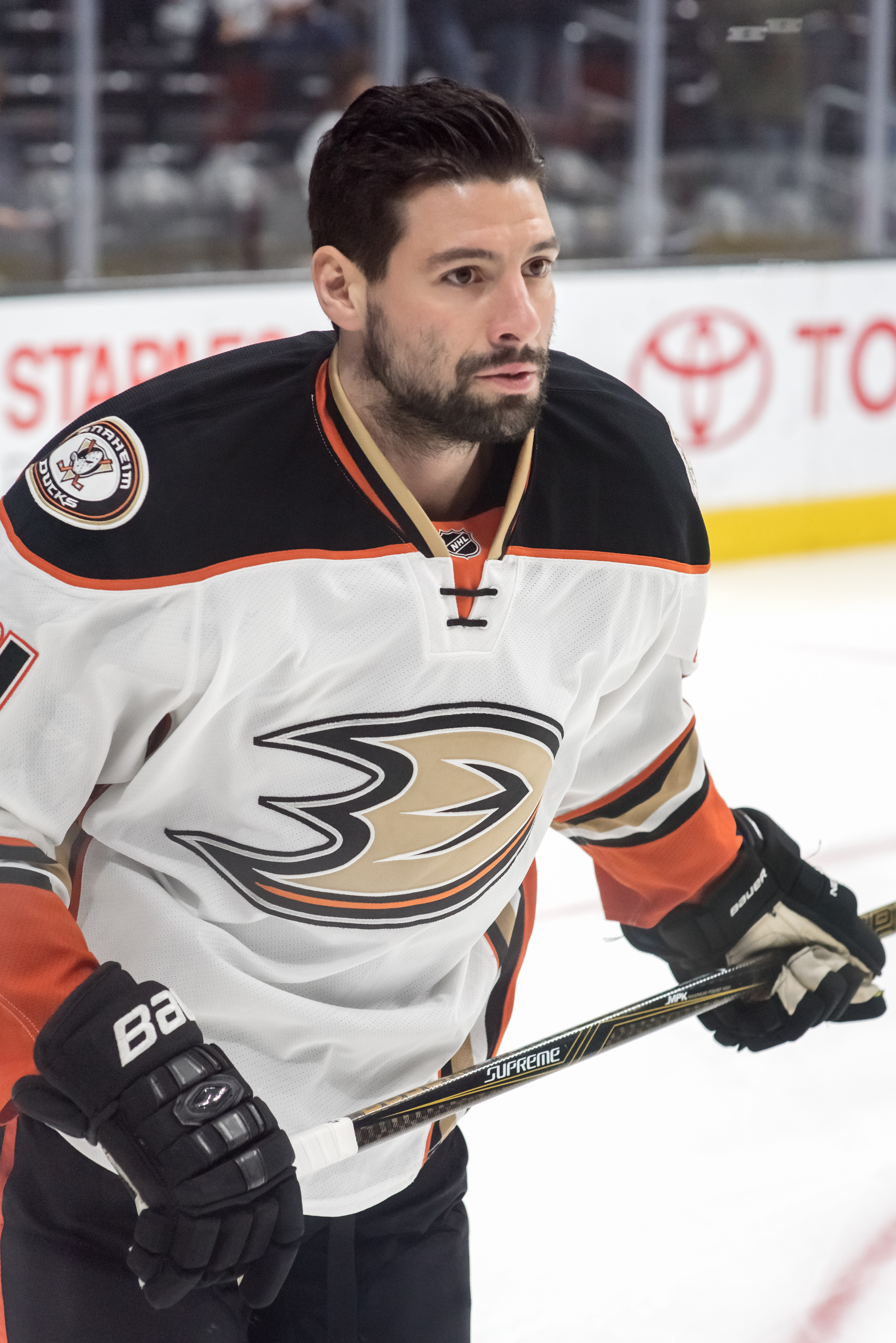
Nate Thompson

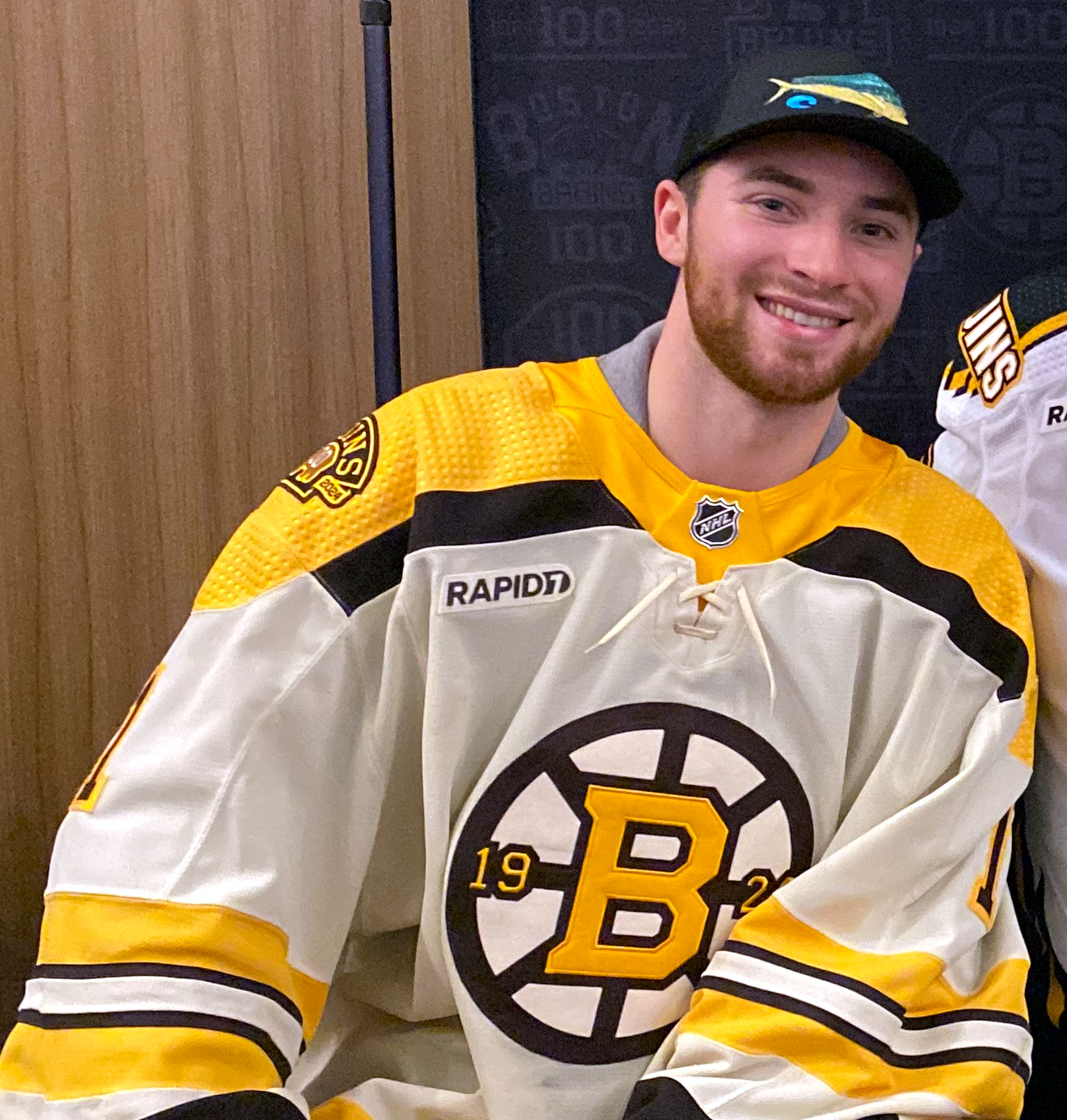
Jeremy Swayman

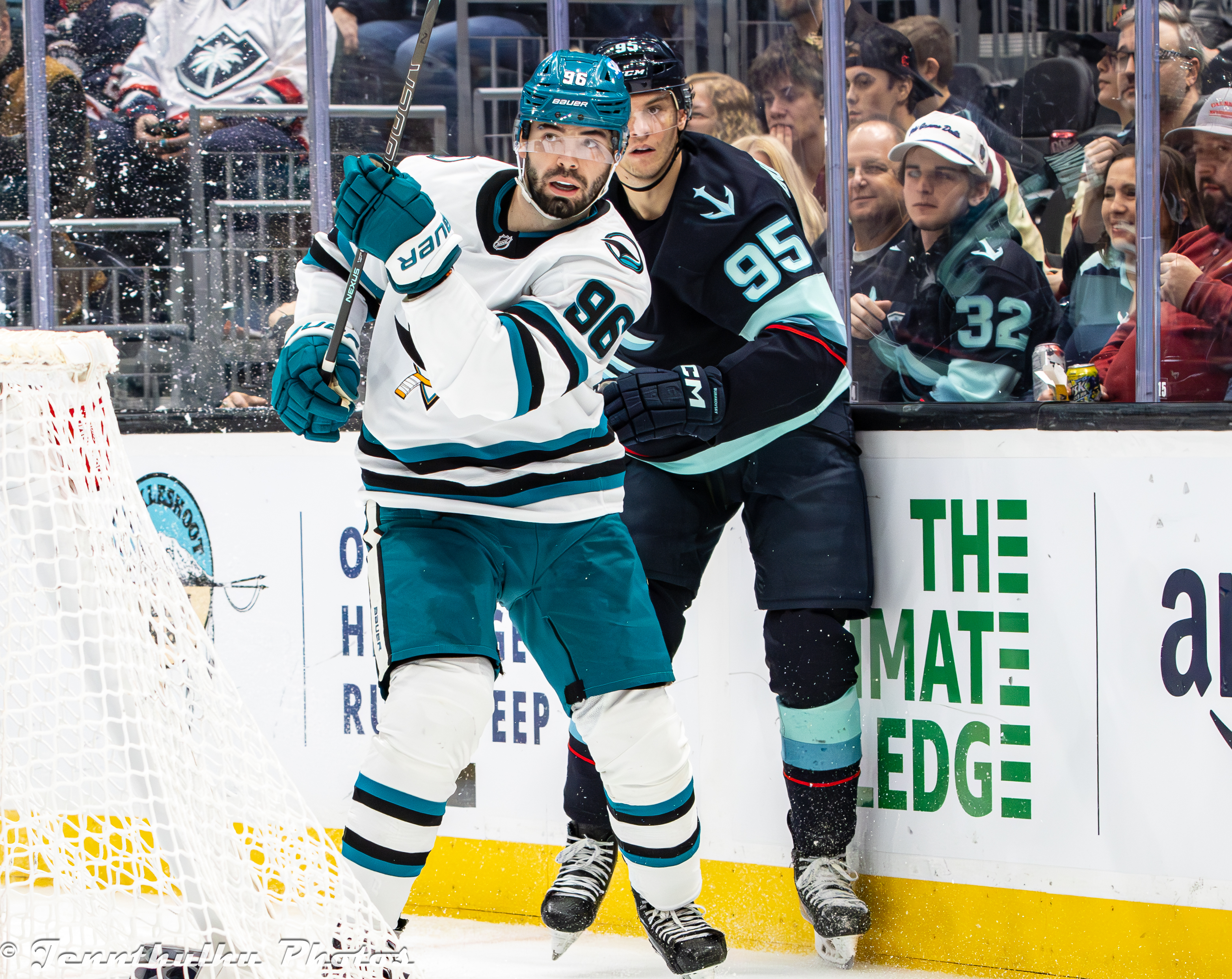
Jake Walman

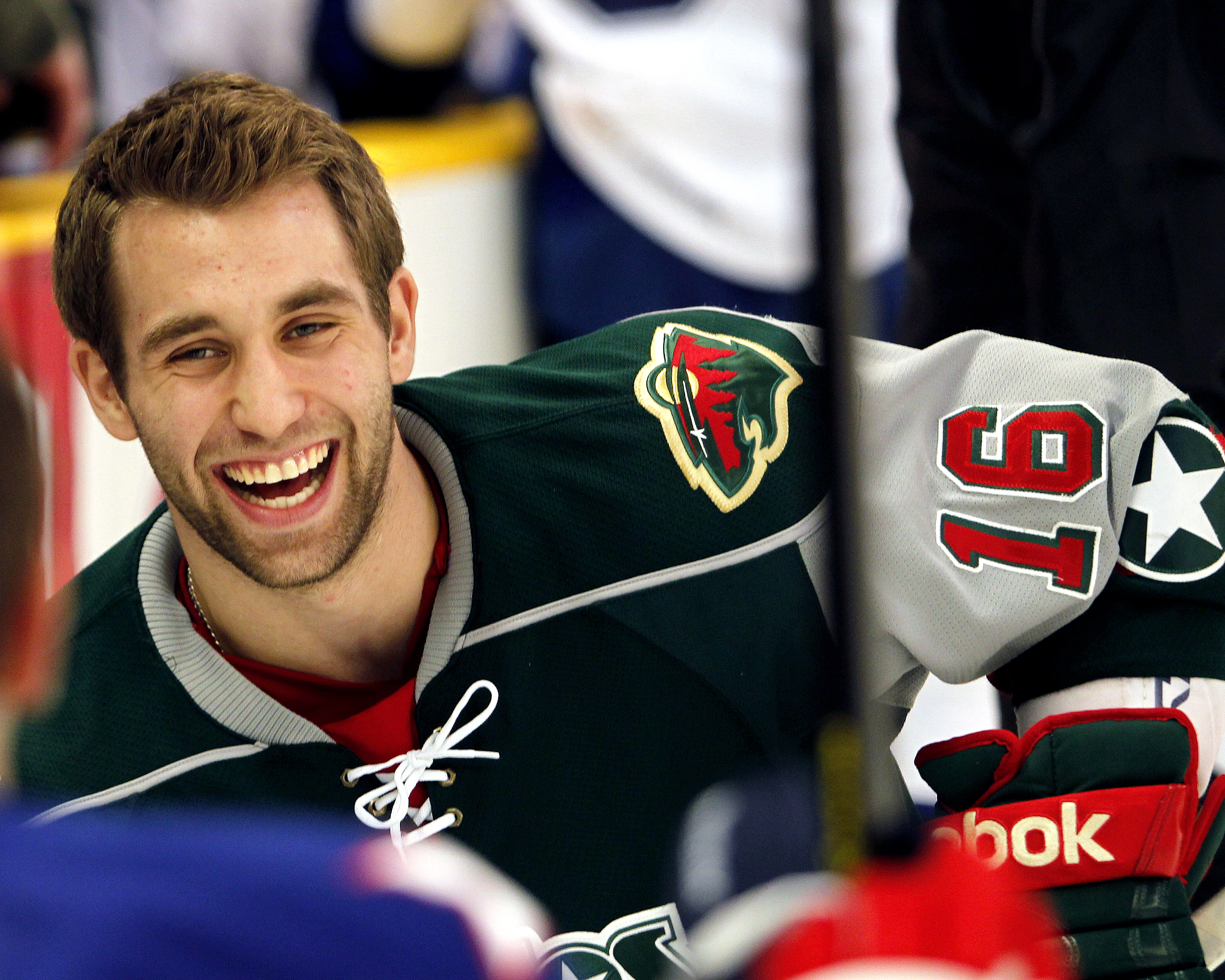
Jason Zucker

- Rudi Ball, Germany, right wing, Olympic bronze, world runner-up, bronze, IIHF Hall of Fame
- Andrew Berenzweig, US, defenseman (NHL)
- Max Birbraer, Russia/Kazakhstan; lived & played in Israel; 1st Israeli drafted by NHL team (NHL)
- Austin Block, US, center and forward
- **Jonathon Blum**, US, defenseman (EHC Red Bull München)
- Ross Brooks, Canada, goaltender (NHL)
- Mike Brown, US, right wing (NHL)
- **Zeev Buium**, Israel/US, defenseman, 1st Israeli citizen to play in NHL (Vancouver Canucks)
- **Shai Buium,** Israel/US, defenseman (Grand Rapids Griffins / Detroit Red Wings)
- Hy Buller, Canada-born US, All-Star defenseman (NHL)
- **André Burakovsky**, Austria-born Sweden, left wing (Chicago Blackhawks)
- Robert Burakovsky, Sweden, right wing (NHL)
- **Andrew Calof**, Canada, centre (HK Poprad)
- Michael Cammalleri, Canada, left wing (NHL)
- **Carter Camper**, US, center (IK Oskarshamn)
- **Sasha Chmelevski**, US, center (Salavat Yulaev Ufa)
- **Jakob Chychrun**, US/Canada (Jewish mother, practicing Christian), defenseman (Washington Capitals)
- **Samantha Cogan**, Canada, forward (Minnesota Frost)
- Colby Cohen, US, defenseman (NHL)
- Charlie Cotch, Canada, left wing (NHL)
- **Olivier Dame-Malka**, Canada-born France, defenceman (Tulsa Oilers)
- Sara DeCosta, US, goaltender, Olympic gold and silver, 2000 & 2002 USA Hockey Women's Player of the Year Award
- **Jason Demers**, Canada, defenceman (free agent)
- Scott Drevitch, US, defense
- Justin Duberman, US, right wing (NHL)
- Steve Dubinsky, Canada, centre (NHL)
- Alon Eizenman, Canada-born Israel, centre
- Oren Eizenman, Canada-born Israel, centre
- **David Elsner**, Germany, right wing (1. EV Weiden)
- Sam Faber, US, forward
- **Adam Fox**, US, defenseman (New York Rangers)
- **Ethen Frank**, US, forward (Washington Capitals)
- **Aerin Frankel**, US, goaltender (PWHL) (Boston Fleet)
- **Kaleigh Fratkin**, Canada, defenceman (PWHL) (Boston Fleet)
- Doug Friedman, US, forward
- **Mark Friedman**, Canada, defenceman (Rögle BK)
- Chelsey Goldberg, US, forward (PWHPA)
- Jørn Goldstein, Norway, goaltender, Olympian and national team, awarded the Gold Puck as best player of the season
- Dov Grumet-Morris, US, goaltender (AHL)
- **Cole Guttman**, US, center (Chicago Blackhawks)
- Jeff Halpern, US, center (NHL)
- **Jordan Harris**, US, defenseman (Boston Bruins)
- Gizzy Hart, Canada, left wing (NHL)
- **Elle Hartje**, US, forward (PWHL) (New York Sirens)
- Mike Hartman, US, left wing (NHL)
- Karel Hartmann, Czechoslovakia (Sparta Prague), left wing, Olympic bronze medal, vice-president of the International Ice Hockey Federation
- Adam Henrich, Canada, left wing/centre
- Michael Henrich, Canada, right wing, 1st Jewish player drafted in NHL 1st round (by Edmonton Oilers)
- Eric Himelfarb, Canada, centre
- Kim Hirschovits, Finland, center
- **Josh Ho-Sang**, Canada, right wing (Florida Everblades)
- **Jack Hughes**, US, center (New Jersey Devils), 2019 NHL entry draft #1 overall pick
- **Luke Hughes**, US, defenseman (New Jersey Devils)
- **Quinn Hughes**, US, defenseman (Minnesota Wild)
- **Zach Hyman**, Canada, left wing/centre (Edmonton Oilers), 1st and only Jewish player to score more than 50 goals in an NHL regular season (2023–24)
- Peter Ing, Canada, goaltender (NHL)
- Joe Ironstone, Canada, goaltender (NHL)
- Max Kaminsky, Canada, centre (NHL)
- Evan Kaufmann, US, forward
- Mikhail Kravets, Russia, right wing (NHL)
- Alfred Kuchevsky, URS/Russia, defenseman, Olympic champion, bronze
- **Luke Kunin**, US, center (Florida Panthers)
- Max Labovitch, Canada, right wing (NHL)
- **Brendan Leipsic**, Canada-Russia, left wing (SKA Saint Petersburg)
- **Devon Levi**, Canada, goaltender (Edmonton Oilers)
- **David Levin**, Israeli-born Canadian, left wing, 1st overall 2015 OHL draft selection (CSM Corona Brașov)
- Alex Levinsky, US/Canada, defenceman (NHL)
- Grant Lewis, US, defenseman (NHL)
- David Littman, US, goaltender (NHL)
- Yuri Lyapkin, URS/Russia, defenseman
- David Meckler, US, left wing
- Jacob Micflikier, Canada, forward
- David Nemirovsky, Canada, right wing (NHL)
- Eric Nystrom, US, left wing, son of former NHL player Bob Nystrom (NHL)
- Cory Pecker, Canada, right wing, drafted 6th round by Calgary Flames in 1999
- **Yaniv Perets**, Canada, goaltender (Lehigh Valley Phantoms)
- Bob Plager, Canada, defenceman (NHL; converted to Judaism)
- **Chase Priskie**, US, defenseman (Buffalo Sabres)
- Dylan Reese, US, defenseman (NHL teams, HV71))
- Steve Richmond, US, defenseman (NHL)
- Maurice Roberts, US, goaltender (NHL)
- Samuel Rothschild, Canada, left wing (NHL)
- François Rozenthal, France, right wing
- Maurice Rozenthal, France, right wing
- **Max Sasson**, US, center (NHL) (Vancouver Canucks)
- Mathieu Schneider, US, defenseman (NHL)
- **Eliezer Sherbatov**, Israeli-Canadian, left wing (Jonquière Marquis)
- Todd Simon, Canada, centre (NHL)
- Trevor Smith, Canada, centre (NHL)
- Brett Sterling, US, left wing (NHL)
- Ronnie Stern, Canada, right wing (NHL)
- **Jeremy Swayman**, US, goaltender (NHL) (Boston Bruins)
- Nate Thompson, US, center (NHL)
- Josh Tordjman, Canada, goaltender (NHL)
- Márton Vas, Hungary, right wing
- Mike Veisor, Canada, goaltender (NHL)
- **Jake Walman**, Canada-US, defenseman (Edmonton Oilers)
- David Warsofsky, US, defenseman
- Ryan Warsofsky, US, defenseman; head coach of the San Jose Sharks
- Ellen Weinberg-Hughes, US, defenseman, world championship silver medal
- Hermann Weiss, Austria, goaltender
- **Jasper Weatherby**, US, forward (Bílí Tygři Liberec)
- **Ethan Werek**, Canada-China, forward (free agent)
- **Ozzy Wiesblatt**, Canada, right wing (Nashville Predators)
- Brian Wilks, Canada, centre (NHL)
- Bob Winograd, Canada, defenceman, first Jewish player selected in the NHL draft
- Bernie Wolfe, Canada, goaltender (NHL)
- Victor "Chick" Zamick, Canada, centre (British Ice Hockey Hall of Fame)
- Larry Zeidel, Canada, defenceman (NHL)
- Alexei Zhitnik, Ukraine-born Russia, defenseman (NHL)
- **Jason Zucker**, US, left wing (Buffalo Sabres)

== Judo ==
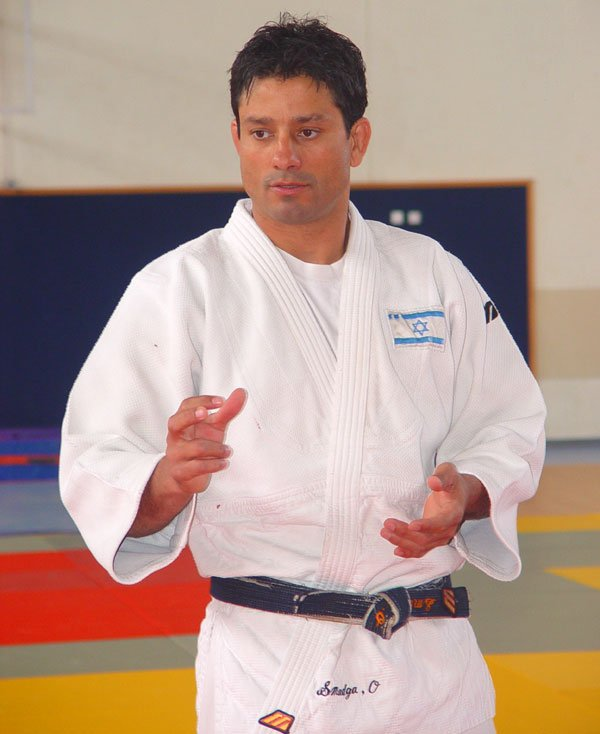
Oren Smadja

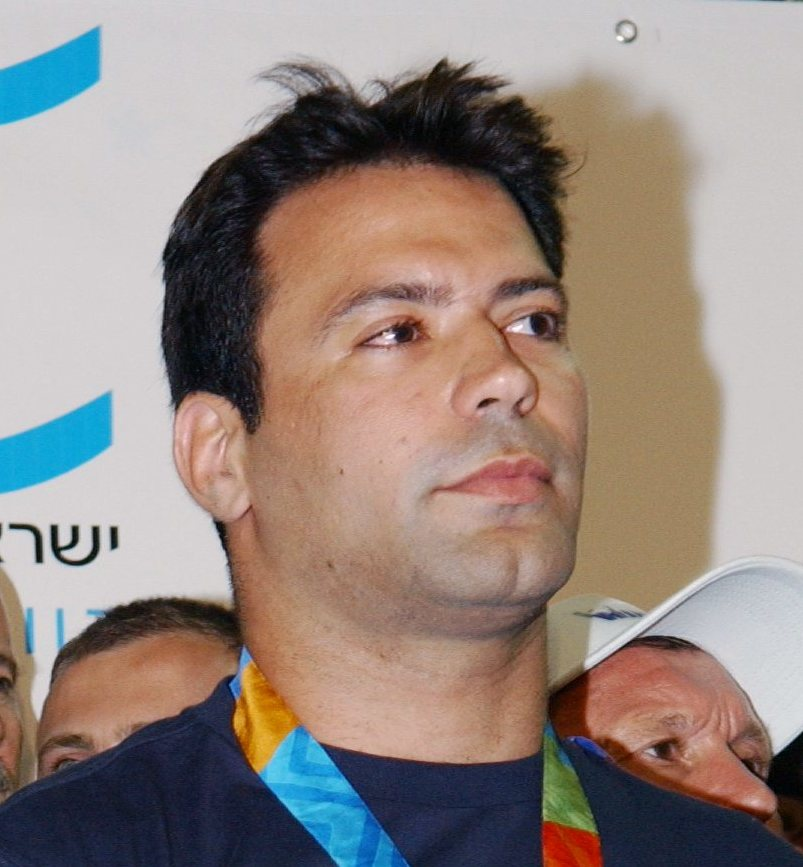
Arik Ze'evi

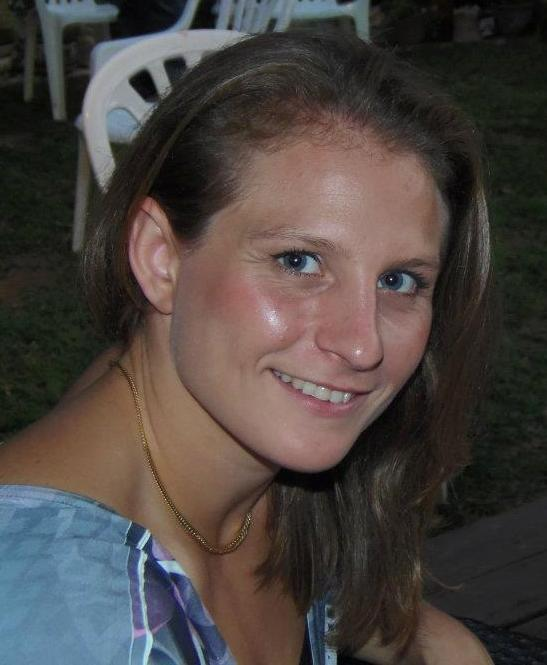
Alice Schlesinger

- Yael Arad, Israel, 1992 Olympic silver (light-middleweight)
- Mark Berger, Canada, Olympic silver & bronze (heavyweight)
- Robert Berland, US, Olympic silver (middleweight)
- Ārons Bogoļubovs, URS/Latvia, Olympic bronze (lightweight)
- James Bregman, US, Olympic bronze (middleweight)
- Aaron Cohen, US
- Yarden Gerbi, Israel, 2016 Olympic bronze (under 63 kg)
- **Maya Goshen**, Israel, 2022 world bronze medalist for mixed teams (men and women)
- **Raz Hershko**, Israel, Olympic silver and bronze, world 2x bronze, European champion
- **Felipe Kitadai**, Brazil, Olympic bronze (60 kg)
- Daniela Krukower, Israel/Argentina, world champion (under 63 kg)
- **Inbar Lanir**, Israel, World Champion, Olympic silver (‍–‍78 kg) and bronze (mixed)
- **Charlee Minkin**, US, Pan American women's champion (half lightweight division; under 52 kg)
- **Sagi Muki**, Israel, 2019 World Champion (under 81 kg), Olympic bronze, 2022 World bronze medalist for mixed teams (men and women), 2015 & 2018 European champion
- **Peter Paltchik**, Israel, Olympic 2x bronze, world 2x bronze
- Moshe Ponte, Israel, Olympian (half-middleweight)
- **Gefen Primo**, Israel, 2018 & 2021 European bronze medalist, 2021 World bronze medalist (under 52 kg)
- **Shira Rishony**, Israel, -48 kg
- Or "Ori" Sasson, Israel, 2016 and 2020 Olympic bronze medalist
- Alice Schlesinger, Israel-Britain, World Judo Championships bronze; European junior champion (under 63 kg)
- **Baruch Shmailov**, Israel, Olympic bronze medalist, European U23 champion, European junior champion (under 66 kg)
- Oren Smadja, Israel, 1992 Olympic bronze medalist (lightweight)
- **Ehud Vaks**, Israel (half-lightweight)
- **Gal Yekutiel**, Israel, European bronze medalist 2× Olympian
- Ariel "Arik" Ze'evi, Israel, 2004 Olympic bronze medalist (100 kg)

== Lacrosse ==
- **Max Seibald**, US (Philadelphia Wings)

== Mixed martial arts ==
- **Cyril Benzaquen**, France, world champion of kickboxing, world champion of Muaythai, light heavyweight
- **Nili Block**, Israeli world champion kickboxer and Muay Thai fighter; 60 kg (132 pound) weight class
- **Johann Fauveau**, France, world champion of Kickboxing, super welterweight
- **Ilya Grad**, Israel, lightweight Muay Thai boxing champion
- **Emily Kagan**, US, UFC fighter in the women's strawweight division; competed in season 20 of The Ultimate Fighter
- Sarah Kaufman, Canada, former Invicta and Strikeforce Bantamweight champion
- **Noad "Neo" Lahat**, Israel, featherweight MMA (UFC)
- Ross Levine, US, karate combat champion
- **Natan Levy***, Israel, featherweight mixed martial artist in the UFC
- **Ido Pariente**, Israel, lightweight Pankration World Champion
- **Yulia Sachkov**, Israel, world champion kickboxer
- Marina Shafir, Moldova-US
- **Rory Singer**, US, middleweight fighter from The Ultimate Fighter 3

== Motorsport ==
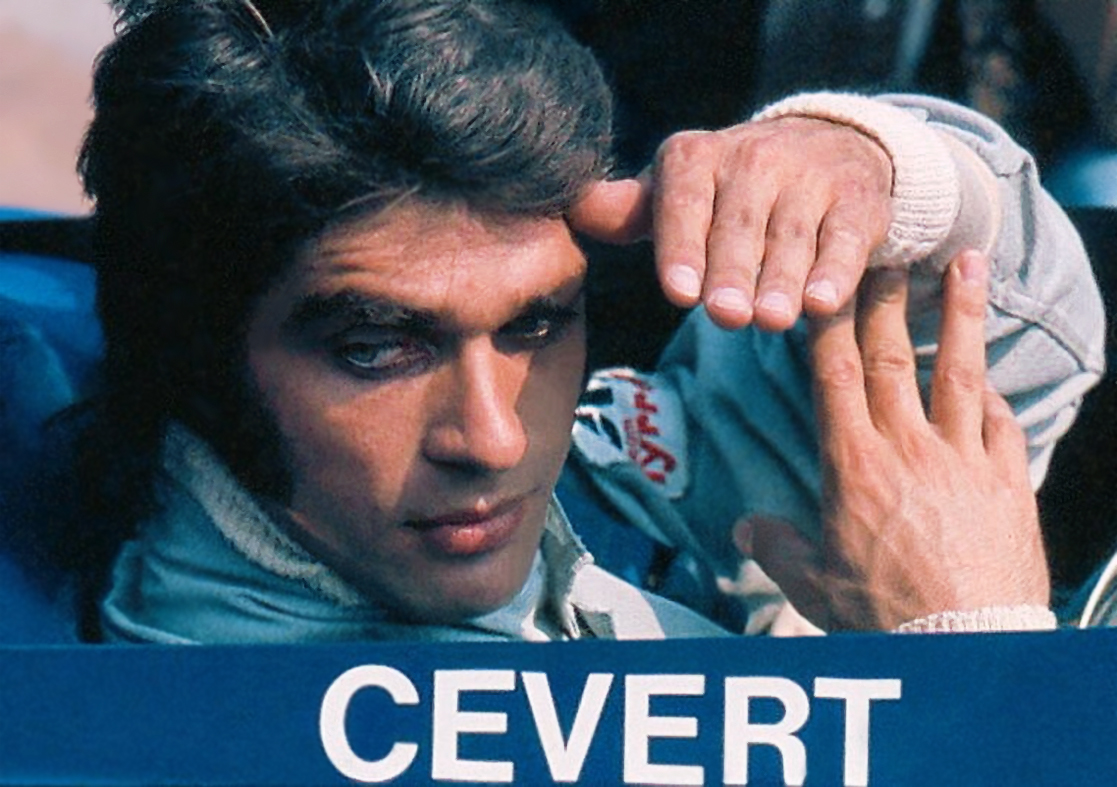
François Cevert

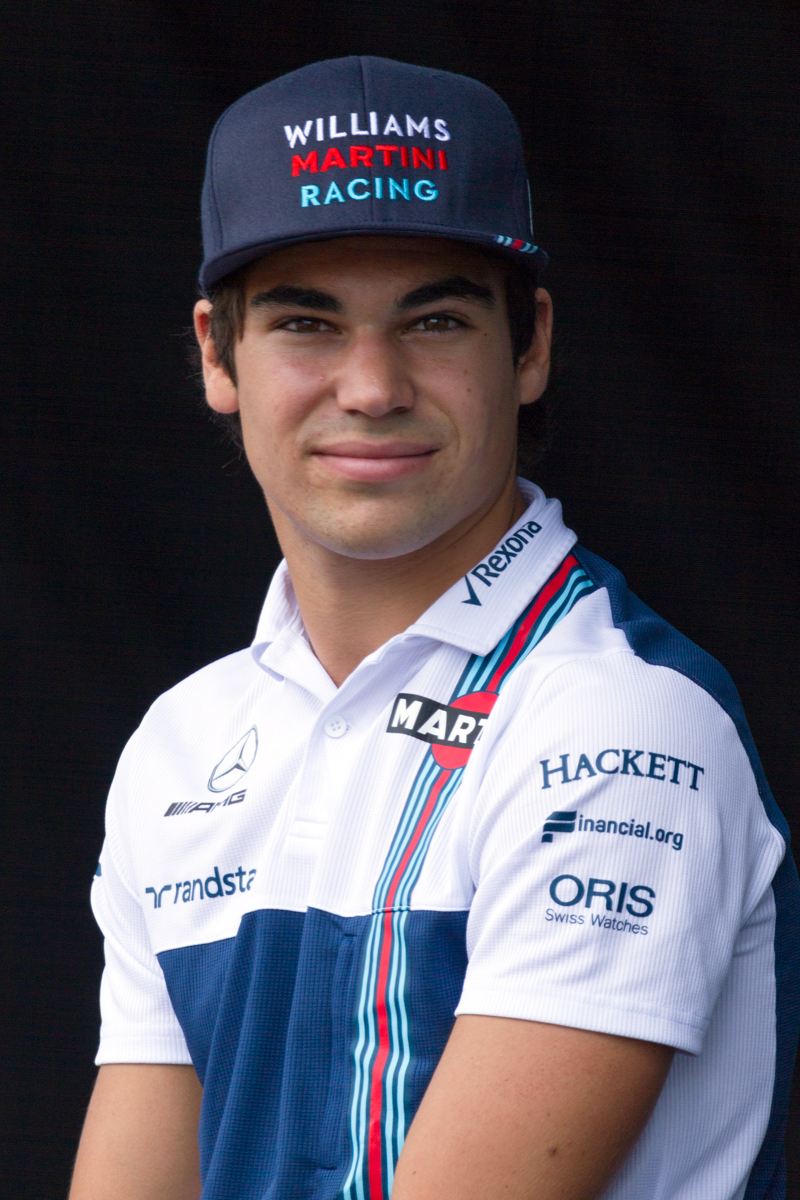
Lance Stroll

- Woolf Barnato, UK, x3 24 hours of Le Mans winner
- Brandon Bernstein, US, drag racing driver and son of Kenny Bernstein
- Kenny Bernstein, US, drag racing driver and former NASCAR owner
- Jo Bonnier, Sweden, Formula One and sports car driver
- François Cevert (born "Albert Goldenberg", Christian mother), France, Formula One driver
- **Tim Coronel**, Netherlands, Twin brother of Tom
- **Tom Coronel**, Netherlands, World Touring Car Championship
- **Alon Day**, Israel, Whelen Euro Series
- Jon Denning, US, NASCAR driver and National Jewish Sports Hall of Fame and Museum inductee
- René Dreyfus, France, Grand Prix racer
- Thomas Erdos, Brazil, sports cars, LMP2 champion 2007, 2010, British GT Champion 2002, British Formula Renault champion 1990
- Mário Haberfeld, Brazil, Champ Car driver
- Kyle Krisiloff, US, NASCAR and USAC driver
- Steve Krisiloff, US, USAC and CART Championship Car driver
- Eric Lichtenstein, Argentina, GP3 driver
- Stirling Moss, UK, Formula One driver
- Paul Newman, US, motorsport team owner and driver; actor
- Chanoch Nissany, Israel, Formula One test-driver, father of Roy Nissany
- **Roy Nissany**, Israel-France, Formula V8 3.5, son of Chanoch Nissany
- Peter Revson, US, Formula One driver
- Mauri Rose, US, Indy driver, Indy 500 winner
- Ricardo Rosset, Brazil, Formula One driver
- Eddie Sachs, US, 8× starter of the Indianapolis 500, 1957–64, taking pole position in 1960 and 1961, with his best finish being second in 1961
- Ian Scheckter, South Africa, Formula One driver (brother of Jody Scheckter and uncle of Tomas Scheckter)
- Jody Scheckter, South Africa, Formula One driver, 1979 Formula One World Drivers champion (brother of Ian Scheckter and father of Tomas Scheckter)
- Tomas Scheckter, South Africa, Indy Racing League driver
- **Robert Shwartzman**, Russia-Israel, racing driver
- **Nolan Siegel**, US, IndyCar driver
- **Lance Stroll**, Canada-Belgium, Formula One driver, second youngest podium finisher in F1 history, and youngest rookie podium. Son of Lawrence Stroll
- Sheila van Damm, British rally driver
- Lionel Van Praag, Australian motorcycle Speedway World Champion

== Professional wrestling ==
- David Arquette, US, former WCW World Heavyweight Championship
- Lior Ben-David, Israeli-British
- Beau Beverly (Wayne Bloom), member of WWE tag team the Beverly Brothers
- Matt Bloom (a.k.a. Jason Albert, "Albert", "A-Train", and "Tensai"), US, WWE Intercontinental Champion and IWGP World Tag Team Champion
- **Colt Cabana** (Scott Colton), US, a.k.a. "Scotty Goldman", 2× NWA World Heavyweight Champion
- Eddie Creatchman
- Floyd Creatchman
- **Noam Dar**, Israeli-born Scottish professional wrestler
- Ric Drasin
- **Maxwell Jacob Friedman**, former AEW World Heavyweight Champion
- Joel Gertner
- **Bill Goldberg**, US, 1× WCW World Heavyweight Champion, 1× World Heavyweight Champion and 2× WWE Universal Champion, second longest winning streak in professional wrestling
- **Simon Gotch**
- **Drew Gulak**, US, former WWE/NXT Cruiserweight Champion
- Rafael Halperin, Austrian-born Israeli
- Paul Heyman
- Barry Horowitz, US
- Abe Jacobs
- Andy Kaufman
- **Kelly Kelly** (Barbie Blank), US, WWE Divas Champion and WWE 24/7 Champion
- Billy Kidman
- Yakov Kozalchik
- Butch Levy (Len Levy), US, 2× NWA World Tag Team Champion
- Donn Lewin
- Mark Lewin
- Ted Lewin
- Boris Malenko (Lawrence Simon), US, multiple professional wrestling championships throughout the 1960s and 1970s
- Chad Malenko (Chad Collyer), US, 4× RQW Heavyweight Champion
- Dean Malenko (Dean Simon), US, 2× WWF Light Heavyweight Champion
- Joe Malenko
- Ida Mae Martinez
- Leapin' Lanny Poffo ("The Genius"), Canada-US, Savage's brother
- Raven (Scott Levy), US, 2× ECW World Heavyweight Champion, NWA World Heavyweight Champion, and 27× WWF/E Hardcore Champion
- Ernie Roth
- Bert Ruby
- Randy Savage (Randall Poffo), US, 2× WWF World Heavyweight Champion and 4x WCW World Heavyweight Champion, WWF Intercontinental Champion
- Scott L. Schwartz
- **Marina Shafir**
- Tomer Shalom, Israel
- Izzy Slapawitz
- David Starr
- Ray Stern
- Matt Stryker
- **Matt Sydal** (Matt Korklan; a.k.a. Evan Bourne), US, WWE Tag Team Champion
- Lisa Marie Varon (aka "Victoria" and "Tara"), US, 2× WWE Women's Champion, 5× TNA Knockouts Champion)

== Rock climbing ==
- Oscar Eckenstein, England, pioneer in the sport of bouldering
- **Jesse Grupper**, US, Olympic rock climber
- Renan Öztürk, Turkish-American, rock climber

== Rowing ==
- Jean Klein, France, Olympic silver
- Károly Levitzky, Hungary, Olympic bronze
- Guy Nosbaum, France, Olympic silver
- Allen Rosenberg, US, champion and Olympics coach
- Donald Spero, US multi-collegiate (Cornell 8+) and national champion (1×), multi-European medalist (1×, 2×), world champion (1×), Henley Royal Regatta champion (1×), Gold Cup champion (1×), US Olympian (1×), and a founder of the National Rowing Foundation
- **Josh West**, American-born British, men's eight, Olympic silver, 2× World Rowing Championships silver and one bronze

== Rugby league ==
Albert Rosenfeld

- Lewis Harris, England, English rugby league
- Wilf Rosenberg, South African rugby union, and later rugby league
- Albert Rosenfeld, Australia, five-eighth, Australian rugby league
- Ian Rubin, Ukraine/Australia, Russia national team
- Geoff Selby, Australia, St George Dragons
- Mark Shulman, Australian rugby league

== Rugby union ==
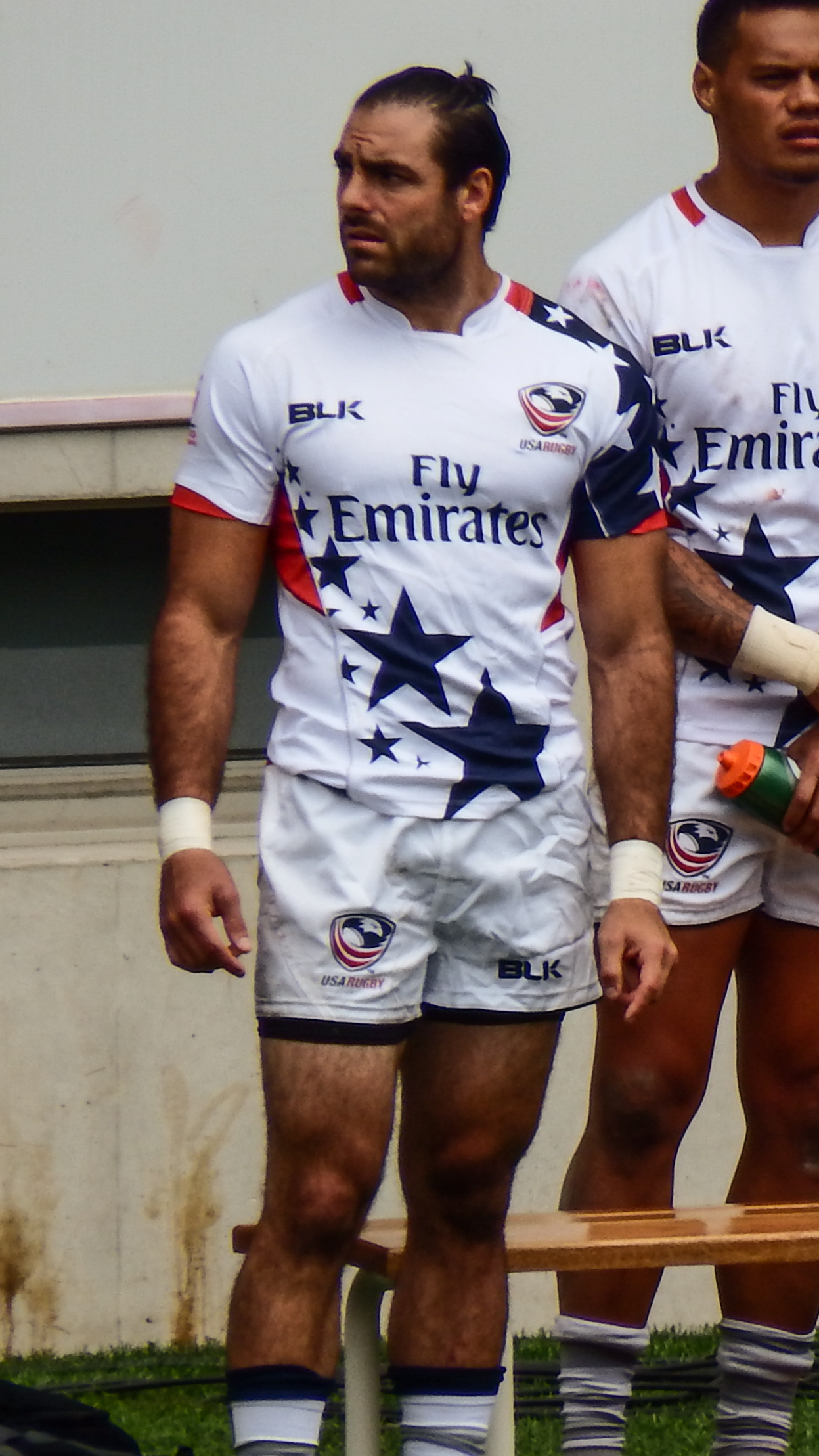
Nate Ebner

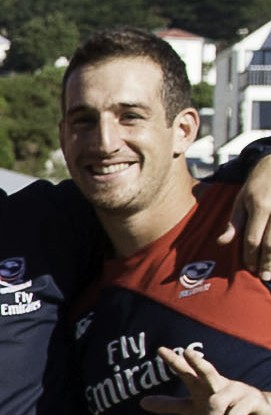
Zack Test

- Nathan Amos, Israel
- Louis Babrow, South Africa, South Africa national team
- Leo Camron, South Africa/Israel; helped introduce rugby to Israel
- Hacjivah Dayimani, South Africa, flanker, Stormers
- **Nate Ebner**, 2016 US Olympic Team at Rio de Janeiro
- **Sacha Feinberg-Mngomezulu**, South Africa, Stormers
- Okey Geffin, South Africa, forward, South Africa national team
- Samuel Goodman, US, player and manager of gold-winning US Olympic team
- **David Horwitz**, Australian rugby union fly-half and centre
- Joe Kaminer, South Africa, South Africa national team
- Josh Kronfeld, New Zealand, flanker, New Zealand national team
- Henri Levée, France, centre
- **Sarah Levy** (born 1995), South Africa/US Olympic bronze, rugby union and rugby sevens player; great-granddaughter of Louis Babrow
- Aaron Liffchak, England, prop
- Shawn Lipman, South Africa/US, US national team
- Alan Menter, England/South Africa, South Africa national team
- Cecil Moss, South Africa, South Africa national team
- Sydney Nomis, South Africa national team
- John Raphael, Belgium/England, England national team
- Jeremy Reingold, South Africa, WP, rugby union, Springbok U21
- Wilf Rosenberg, South Africa; rugby union, and later rugby league
- Myer Rosenblum, South Africa/Australia, flanker, Australia
- Rupert Rosenblum, Australia, Australia national team
- Albert Rosenfeld, Australian rugby player
- Fred Smollan, South Africa, South Africa national team
- Bethel Solomons, Ireland, forward, Ireland national team
- Scott Spurling, England, hooker
- Dallen Stanford, US, flyhalf/fullback, US national sevens team BH
- Joel Stransky, South Africa, fly-half, South Africa national team, kicked winning points in 1995 Rugby World Cup final
- Zack Test, US, wing/fullback, US national sevens team
- Morris Zimerman, South Africa

== Sailing ==
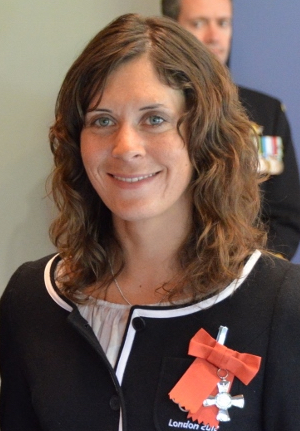
Jo Aleh

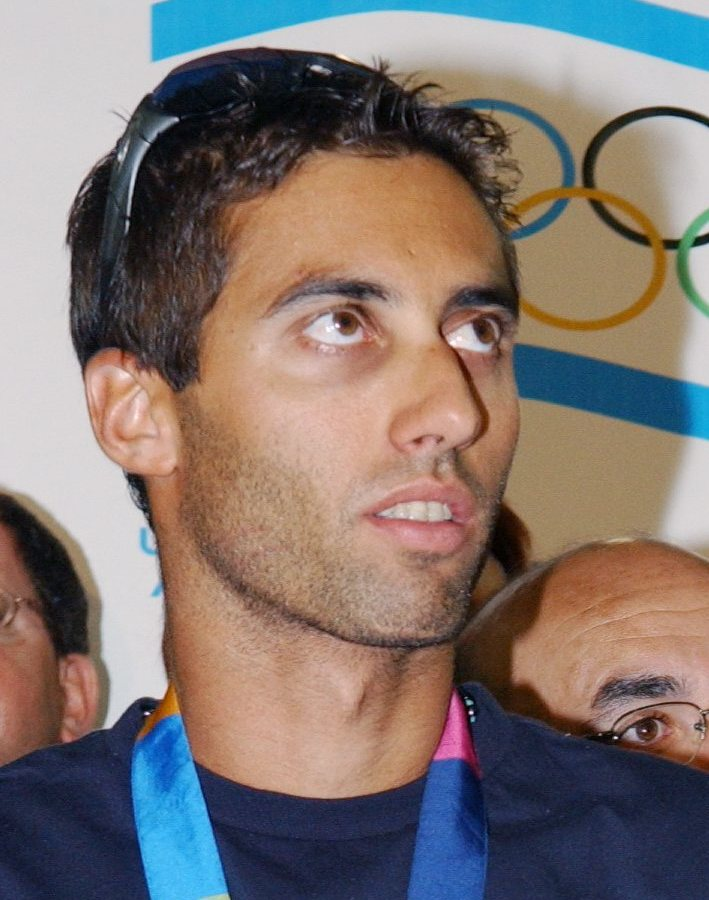
Gal Fridman

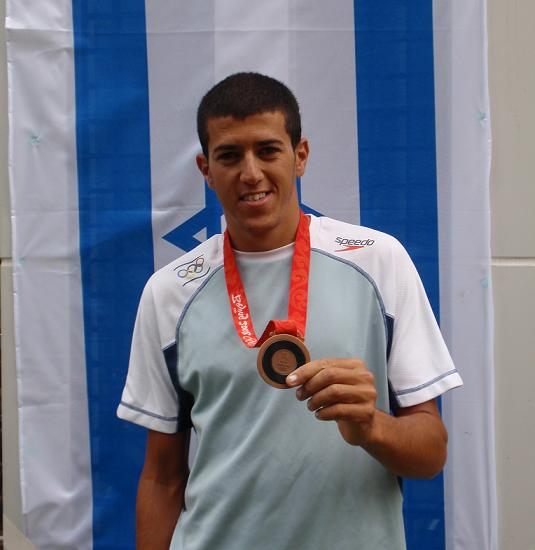
Shahar Tzuberi

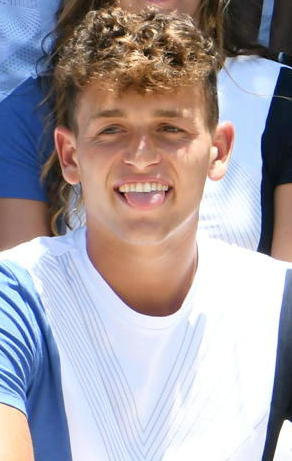
Yoav Cohen

- Daniel Adler, Brazil, Olympic silver (yachting; sailing class)
- **Jo Aleh**, New Zealand, sailor, Olympic champion (470 class), world champion (420 class)
- Eldad Amir, Israel, sailor
- Yehuda Atedji, Israel, sailor
- Shimshon Brokman, Israel, sailor
- Tony Bullimore, British, yachtsman
- Vered Buskila, Israel, sailor
- Zefania Carmel, Israel, yachtsman, world champion (420 class)
- **Don Cohan**, US, Olympic bronze (yachting; dragon class)
- **Yoav Cohen**, Israel, windsurfer, fourth place at the 2020 Summer Olympics
- **Maayan Davidovich**, Israel, windsurfer
- **Nufar Edelman**, Israel, sailor
- Larry Ellison, US, sailor
- Anat Fabrikant, Israel, sailor
- **Gal Fridman**, Israel, windsurfer, 2004 Olympic gold medalist (Israel's first gold medalist), 1996 Olympic bronze medalist (Mistral class)
- Eitan Friedlander, Israel, sailor, world championship gold
- Robert Halperin, US, yachting (star-class)
- Amit Inbar, Israel, windsurfer
- Clare Jacobs, United States, July 1963 winner of 200 mile Chicago Yacht Club Race to Mackinac aboard 45-foot Falcon II
- Peter Jaffe, Great Britain, Olympic silver (yachting; star-class)
- **Sharon Kantor**, Israel, IQFoil windsurfer, Olympic silver, world championship gold
- Nike Kornecki, Italy-born Israel, 470-class
- **Lee Korzits**, Israel, windsurfer, 4× world champion (RS:X)
- Lydia Lazarov, Israel, yachtsman, world champion (420 class)
- Valentyn Mankin, URS/Ukraine, only sailor in Olympic history to win gold medals in three different classes (yachting: finn class, tempest class, and star class), silver (yachting, tempest class)
- **Nimrod Mashiah**, Israel, windsurfer, ranked No. 1 in world (RS:X; 2010)
- **Mark Mendelblatt**, US, Olympic sailor, 2× world silver (laser and sunfish), bronze (laser)
- Robert Mosbacher, US, world championship gold & silver (dragon class), gold (soling class), and bronze (5.5 metre class)
- **Tom Reuveny**, Israel, Olympic champion, men's iQFoil windsurfing, 2x world U21 champion, youth champion
- Ran Shantal, Israel, 470-class, Olympian
- Nir Shental, Israel, 470-class, Olympian
- Dan Torten, Israel, 470-class, Olympian
- Ran Torten, Israel, 470-class, Olympian
- **Shahar Tzuberi**, Israel, windsurfer, 2008 Olympic bronze medalist (RS:X discipline); 2009 & 2010 European Windsurf champion
- Eli Zuckerman, Israel, yachtsman, Olympian

== Shooting ==
- Guy Starik, Israel, world record in 50 m rifle prone
- Lev Vainshtein, URS/Russia, 3× team world champion (25 m & 50 m pistol) and Olympic bronze medalist (300 m rifle)

== Skateboarding ==
- Alan Gelfand, US, invented the ollie, the foundational skateboarding trick
- Lynn Kramer, US, 17x women's world champion in slalom skateboarding, and a member of the Skateboard Hall of Fame
- **Minna Stess**, US, Olympian

== Skeleton ==
- **Adam (AJ) Edelman**, US-Israel, 4× national champion, 2018 Olympian

== Skiing and snowboarding ==
- **Arielle Gold**, US, Olympic bronze snowboarder, world champion
- **Taylor Gold**, US, snowboarder
- **Jared Goldberg**, US, Olympic alpine skier, US Junior Championships combined champion, US Championships downhill champion
- Drew Goldsack, Canada, cross country skier, 2× Olympian
- Anna Segal, Australia, Olympic freestyle slopestyle skier, 2× world champion
- **Virgile Vandeput**, Israel, Belgian-born, slalom & giant slalom skier, Olympian

== Softball ==
- Tamara Statman, Israeli National Softball Team

== Speed skating ==
- **Vladislav Bykanov**, Ukraine-born Israel, short-track, Olympian and Silver European Championship
- Andy Gabel, US, Olympic silver (5,000 meter short track relay)
- Rafayel Grach, URS, Olympic silver (500 m), bronze (500 m)
- Irving Jaffee, US, 2× Olympic champion (5,000m, 10,000m), world records (mile, 25 miles)
- **Emery Lehman**, US, Olympic bronze (Team Pursuit)
- Dan Weinstein, US, short-track, 3× world champion (2× team 1,000m, team short-track 5,000m)

== Sports climbing ==
- **Jesse Grupper**, US, Pan-American gold medalist

== Squash ==
- Victor Niederhoffer, U.S., U.S. squash champion, 5x in singles, 2x in doubles; U.S. paddleball champion, 2x in singles, 2x in doubles, Pierre de Coubertin Fair Play Trophy

== Surfing ==
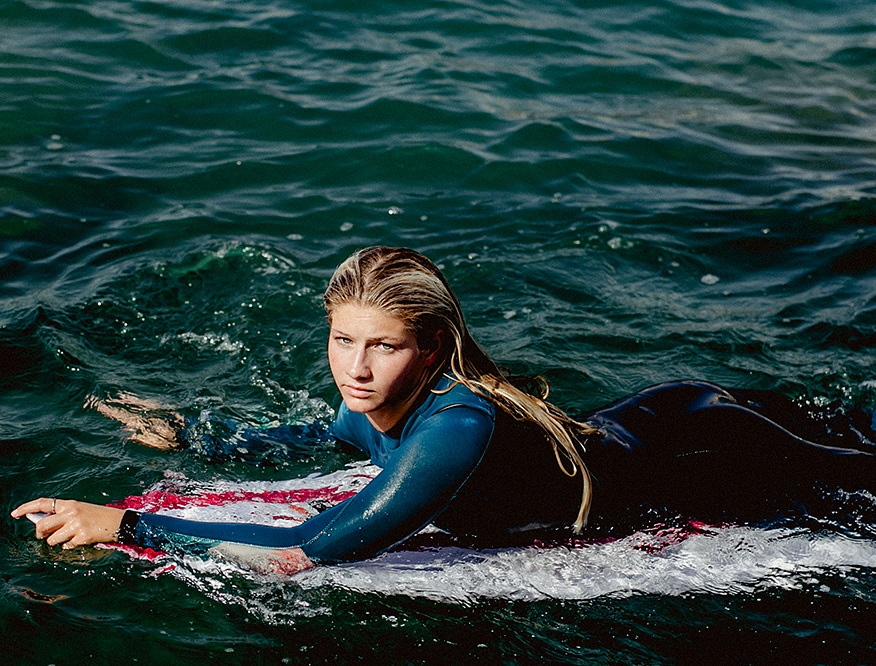
Anat Lelior

- **Anat Lelior**, Israel, 2020 Summer Olympics
- Makua Rothman, US, Big Wave world champion
- Shaun Tomson, South Africa, world champion

== Swimming ==
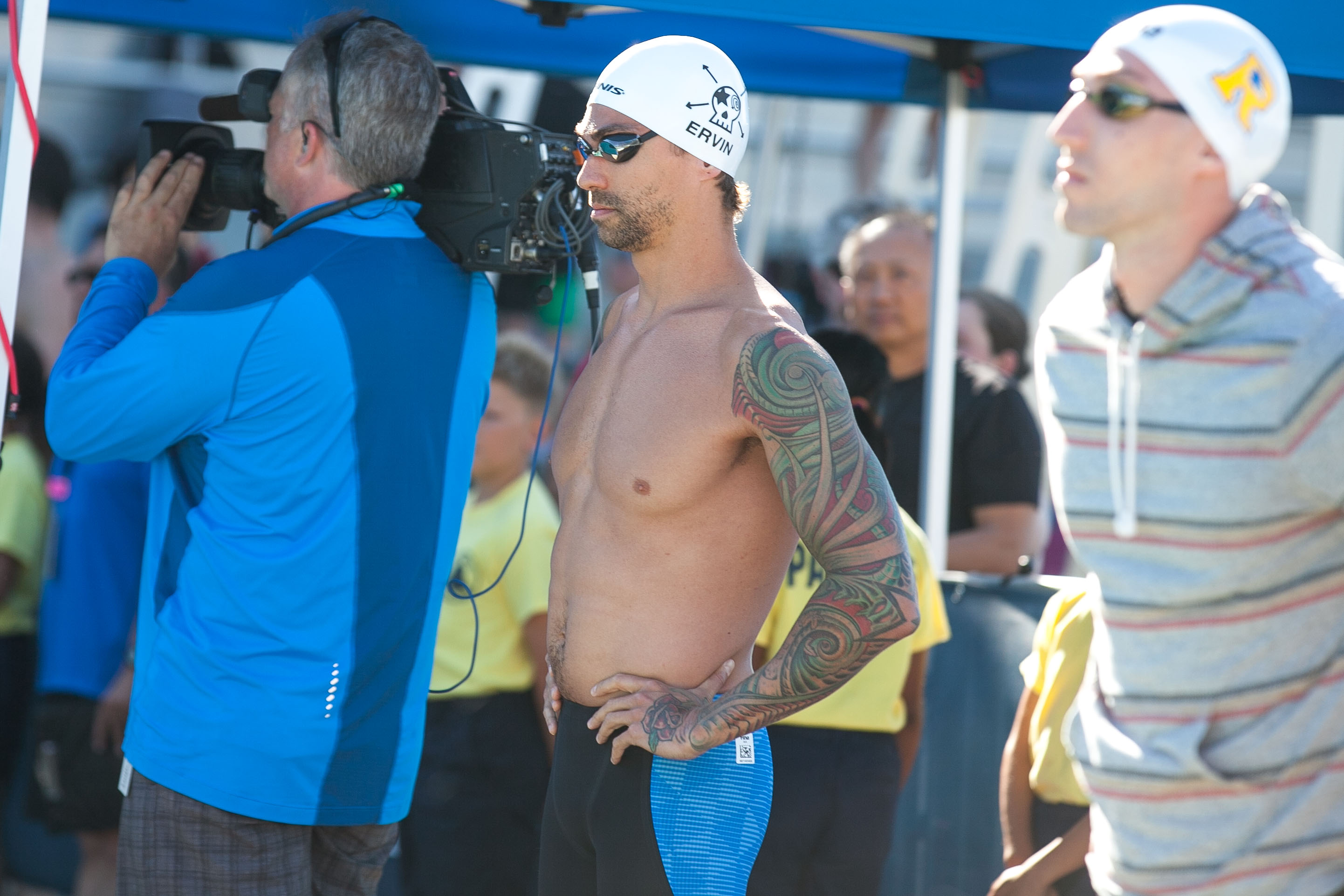
Anthony Ervin

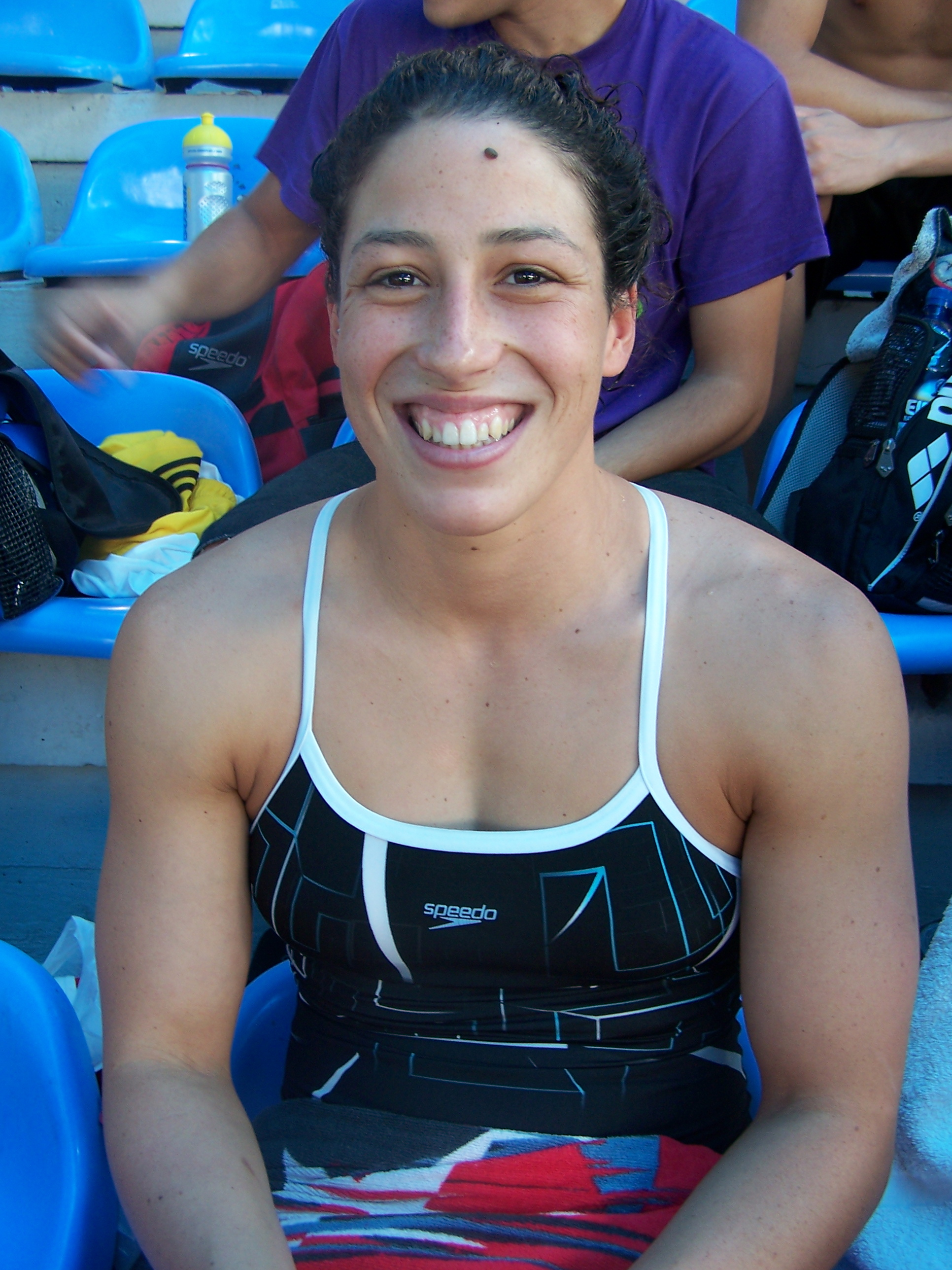
Amit Ivry

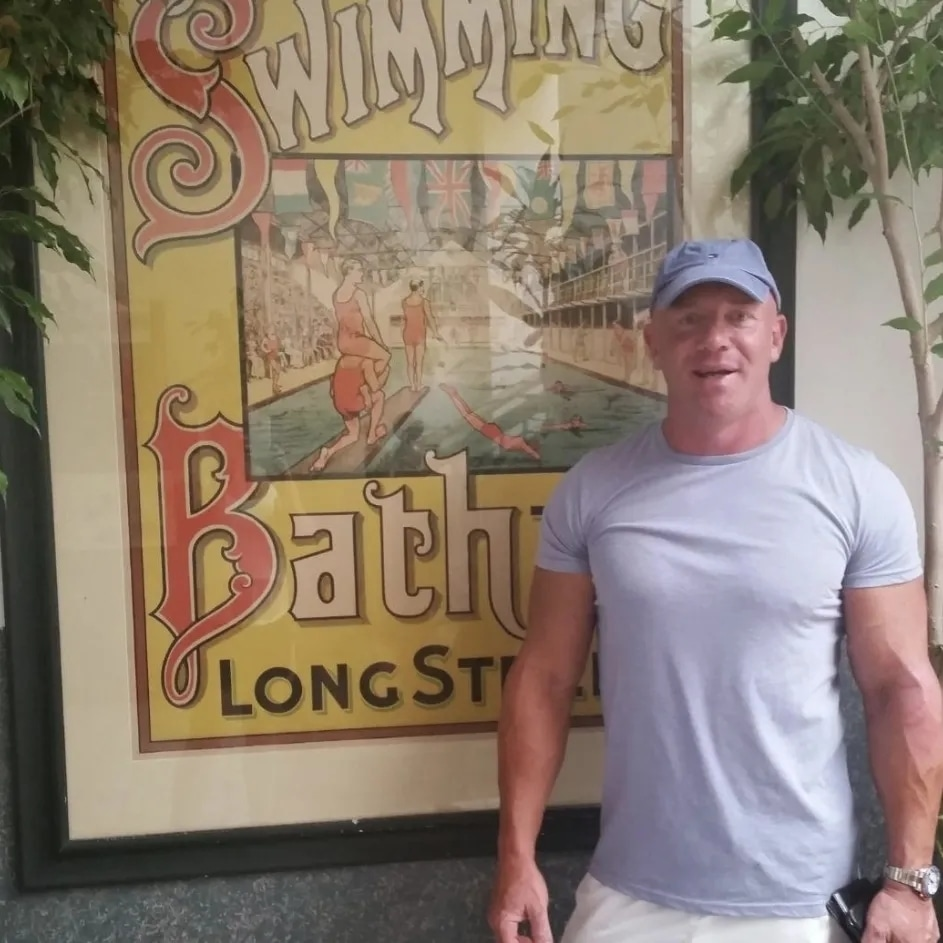
Jeremy Reingold

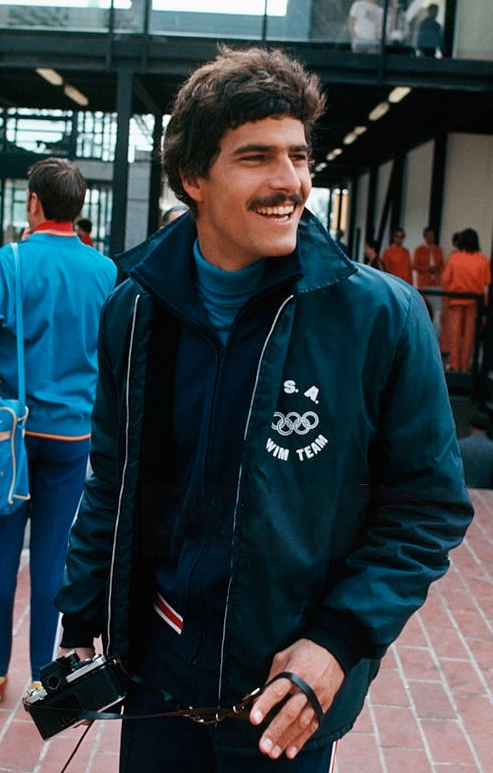
Mark Spitz

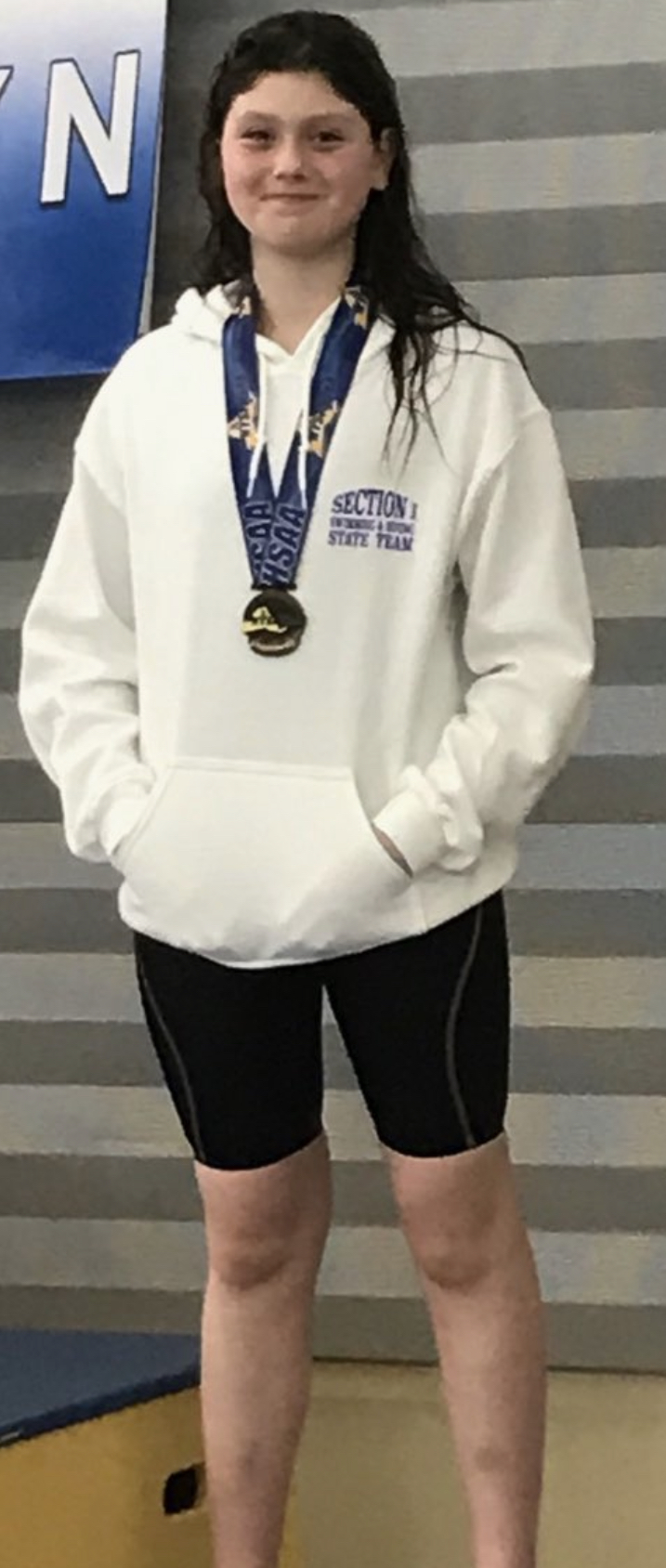
Claire Weinstein

- Margarete "Grete" Adler, Austria, Olympic bronze (4 × 100m freestyle relay)
- Vadim Alexeev, Kazakhstan-born Israeli, breaststroke
- Jessica Antiles, US
- Semyon Belits-Geiman, URS, Olympic silver (400 m freestyle relay) and bronze (800 m freestyle relay); world record in men's 800m freestyle
- Adi Bichman, Israel (400 m and 800m freestyle, 400m medley)
- Damián Blaum, Argentina, open water
- Gérard Blitz, Belgium, Olympic bronze (100 m backstroke), International Swimming Hall of Fame
- Yoav Bruck, Israel (50 m freestyle and 100m freestyle), Israel (50m freestyle and 100m freestyle)
- Tiffany Cohen, US, 2× Olympic champion (400 m and 800m freestyle); 2× Pan American champion (400m and 800m freestyle), International Swimming Hall of Fame
- **Anthony Ervin**, US, Olympic champion (50m freestyle), silver (400 m freestyle relay); 2× world champion (50 m freestyle, 100m freestyle)
- Yoav Gath, Israel (100 and 200 m backstroke)
- Scott Goldblatt, US, Olympic champion (4 × 200m freestyle relay), silver (800 m freestyle relay); world championships silver (4 × 200m freestyle), bronze (4 × 200m freestyle)
- Eran Cohen Groumi, Israel (100 and 200 m backstroke, 100m butterfly)
- Andrea Gyarmati, Hungary, Olympic silver (100 m backstroke) and bronze (100 m butterfly); world championships bronze (200 m backstroke), International Swimming Hall of Fame
- Alfréd Hajós (born "Arnold Guttmann"), Hungary, 3× Olympic champion (100m freestyle, 800m freestyle relay, 1,500m freestyle), International Swimming Hall of Fame
- Michael "Miki" Halika, Israel, 200m butterfly, 200m and 400m individual medley
- Judith Haspel (born "Judith Deutsch"), Austrian-born Israeli, held every Austrian women's middle and long-distance freestyle record in 1935, refused to represent Austria in 1936 Summer Olympics along with Ruth Langer and Lucie Goldner, protesting Hitler, stating, "I refuse to enter a contest in a land which so shamefully persecutes my people."
- Otto Herschmann, Austria, Olympic 2-silver (in fencing/team sabre and 100m freestyle); arrested by Nazis, and died in Izbica concentration camp
- Amit Ivry, Israel, Olympic semi-finalist (200 metre individual medley)
- Herbert Klein, Germany, Olympic bronze (200 m breaststroke); 3 world records
- Lenny Krayzelburg, Ukrainian-born US, 4× Olympic champion (100 m backstroke, 200m backstroke, twice 4 × 100m medley relay); 3× world champion (100m and 200m backstroke, 4 × 100m medley) and 2× silver (4 × 100m medley, 50m backstroke); 3 world records (50m, 100m, and 200m backstroke)
- Dan Kutler, US-born Israeli (100 m butterfly, 4 × 100m medley relay)
- Ruth Langer Lawrence, Austria; along with Judith Haspel and Lucie Goldner refused to represent Austria in 1936 Summer Olympics, their protest stating "We do not boycott Olympia, but Berlin"
- **Keren Leibovitch**, Israeli Paralympic swimmer, 3× world champion, 3 world records (100m and 200m backstroke; 100m freestyle), and 8× Paralympic medal winner
- **Jason Lezak**, US, 4× Olympic champion (twice 4 × 100m medley relay, 4 × 400m medley relay, 4 × 100 freestyle relay), silver (400 m freestyle relay), 2× bronze (100m freestyle, 4 × 100m freestyle relay); 8× world champion (4× 4 × 100m medley, 3× 4 × 100m freestyle, 100m freestyle), silver (4 × 100m medley), bronze (4 × 100m freestyle)
- Klara Milch, Austria, Olympic bronze (4 × 100m freestyle relay)
- József Munk, Hungary, Olympic silver (4 × 200m freestyle relay)
- Alfred "Artem" Nakache, France; world record (200m breaststroke), one-third of French 2× world record (3 × 100m relay team); imprisoned by Nazis in Auschwitz, where his wife and daughter were killed
- Paul Neumann, Austria, Olympic champion (500m freestyle)
- Maxim Podoprigora, Ukrainian-born Austrian Olympic swimmer
- **Sarah Poewe**, South African-born German, Olympic bronze (4 × 100m medley relay)
- Marilyn Ramenofsky, US, Olympic silver (400 m freestyle); 3× world record for 400m freestyle
- Jeremy Reingold, South African, 200m individual medley world record, South South African SA under-21 rugby team
- Keena Rothhammer, US, Olympic champion (800 m freestyle) and bronze (200 m freestyle); world champion (200 m freestyle) and silver (400 m freestyle), International Swimming Hall of Fame
- Otto Scheff (born "Otto Sochaczewsky"), Austria, Olympic champion (400 m freestyle) and 2× bronze (400 m freestyle, 1,500m freestyle)
- Albert Schwartz, US, Olympic bronze (100 m freestyle)
- Mark Spitz, US, Olympic champion (9 golds (400 m freestyle relay twice, 800m freestyle relay twice, 100m freestyle, 200m freestyle, 100m butterfly, 200m butterfly, 400m medley relay), 1 silver (100 m butterfly), 1 bronze (100 m freestyle)), has the second-most gold medals won in a single Olympic Games (7); 5× Pam Am champion; 10× Maccabiah champion; world records (100m and 200m freestyle, 100- and 200m butterfly), International Swimming Hall of Fame
- Josephine Sticker, Austria, Olympic bronze (4 × 100m freestyle relay)
- **Tal Stricker**, Israel (100m and 200m breaststroke, 4 × 100m medley relay)
- András Székely, Hungary, Olympic silver (200 m breaststroke) and bronze (4 × 200m freestyle relay); died in a Nazi concentration camp
- Éva Székely, Hungary, Olympic champion & silver (200 m breaststroke); International Swimming Hall of Fame; mother of Andrea Gyarmati
- Lejzor Ilja Szrajbman, Poland, Olympic 4 × 200m freestyle relay; killed by the Nazis in Majdanek concentration camp
- Judit Temes, Hungary, Olympic champion (4 × 100m freestyle), bronze (100 m freestyle)
- Dara Torres, US, Olympic 4× champion (400 m freestyle relay, 4 × 100m freestyle relay twice, 4 × 100m medley relay), 4× silver (50 m freestyle, 2× 4 × 100m freestyle, 4 × 100m medley relay), 4× bronze (50 m freestyle, 100m freestyle, 100m butterfly, 4 × 100m freestyle relay, 4 × 100m medley relay); world championship silver (4 × 100m freestyle); Pan American champion (4 × 100m freestyle)
- Eithan Urbach, Israel, backstroke, European championship silver & bronze (100 m backstroke)
- Otto Wahle, Austria/US, 2× Olympic silver (1,000 m freestyle, 200m obstacle race) and bronze (400 m freestyle); International Swimming Hall of Fame
- **Garrett Weber-Gale**, US, 2× Olympic champion (4 × 100m freestyle relay, 4 × 100m medley relay); world champion (3× 4 × 100m freestyle, 4 × 100m medley), silver (4 × 200m freestyle)
- Wendy Weinberg, US, Olympic bronze (800 m freestyle); Pan American champion (800 m freestyle)
- **Claire Weinstein**, US, Olympic silver, world champion (women's 4 × 200m freestyle relay)
- **Ben Wildman-Tobriner**, US, Olympic champion (4 × 100m freestyle relay); world champion (2× 4 × 100m freestyle, 50m freestyle)
- Wally Wolf, US, Olympic champion (4 × 200m freestyle relay)
- Imre Zachár, Hungary, Olympic silver (4 × 200m freestyle relay)

== Table tennis ==
- Ruth Aarons, US, 2× world champion
- Ivan Andreadis, Czechoslovakia, 9x world champion
- Viktor Barna (born "Győző Braun"), Hungary/Britain, 22× world champion, International Table Tennis Foundation Hall of Fame ("ITTFHoF")
- Laszlo Bellak, Hungary/US, 7× world champion, ITTFHoF
- Dora Beregi, Hungarian 2× world champion
- Richard Bergmann, Austria/Britain, 7× world champion, ITTFHoF
- Benny Casofsky, English Swaythling Cup player
- Alojzy Ehrlich, Poland, 3× silver and 1× bronze in the world championships; incarcerated by the Nazis in Auschwitz; represented France after 1945
- Shimcha Finkelstein, Poland, World bronze medallist and first champion of Israel
- Magda Gál, Hungarian, 20 world championship medals
- Sandor Glancz, Hungarian, 4× world champion
- Tibor Házi, Hungarian three times world champion
- Jeff Ingber, English international
- Eddie Kantar, American bridge author; only person ever to have played in a World Bridge Championship and a World Table Tennis Championship
- Gertrude "Traute" Kleinová, Czechoslovakia, 3× world champion, incarcerated by the Nazis in Theresienstadt and Auschwitz
- Erwin Kohn, Austrian world champion
- Marina Kravchenko, Ukrainian-born Israeli, URS and Israel national teams
- Pavel Löwy, Czech world bronze medallist and believed to have died in concentration camp
- Hyman Lurie, English three times world bronze medallist
- Dick Miles, US, 10× US champion
- Ivor Montagu, Britain, national team and founder of the International Table Tennis Federation
- Leah Neuberger (Thall), "Miss Ping", US, 29× US champion
- Marty Reisman, US, 3× national champion
- Angelica Rozeanu (Adelstin), Romania/Israel, 17× world champion, ITTFHoF
- Samuel Schieff, Poland world bronze medallist and later Israel international
- Sol Schiff, US double world champion
- Anna Sipos, Hungary, 11× world champion, ITTFHoF
- Miklos Szabados, Hungary/Australia, 15× world champion
- Pablo Tabachnik, Argentina, national team
- Thelma Thall, US, 2× world table tennis champion
- David Zalcberg, Australia, national team

== Taekwondo ==
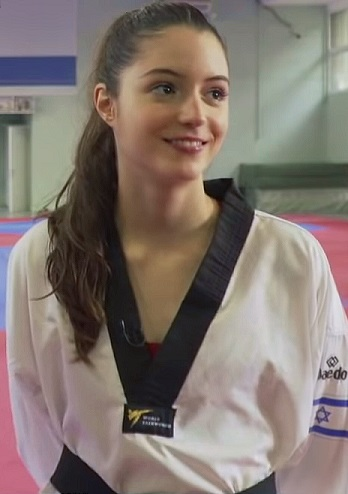
Avishag Semberg

- **Mitchell Bobrow**, USA, All American Open Grand Champion 1969, Madison Square Garden
- **Avishag Semberg**, Israel, Olympic bronze medalist 2020, European gold and silver (49 kg)

== Tennis ==
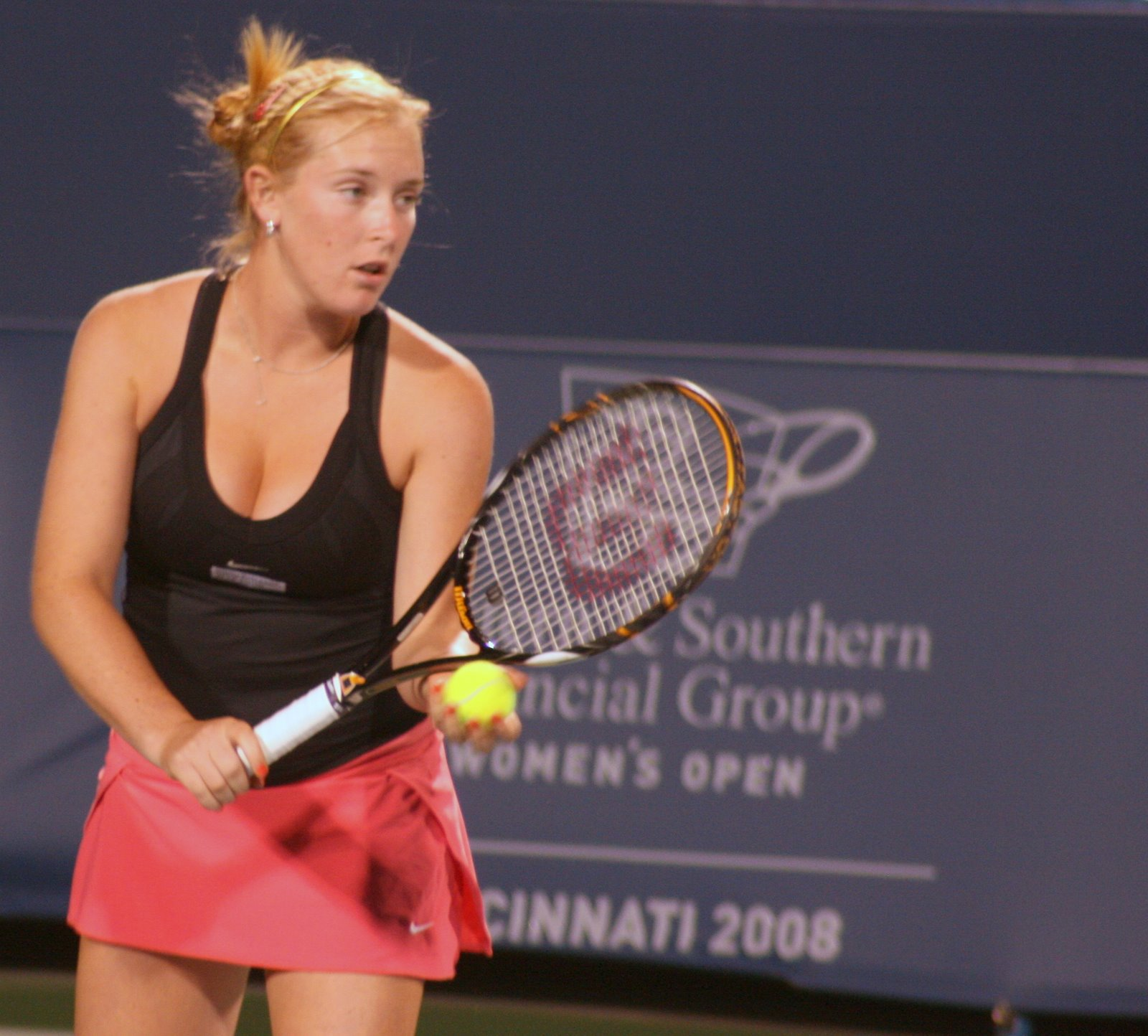
Madison Brengle

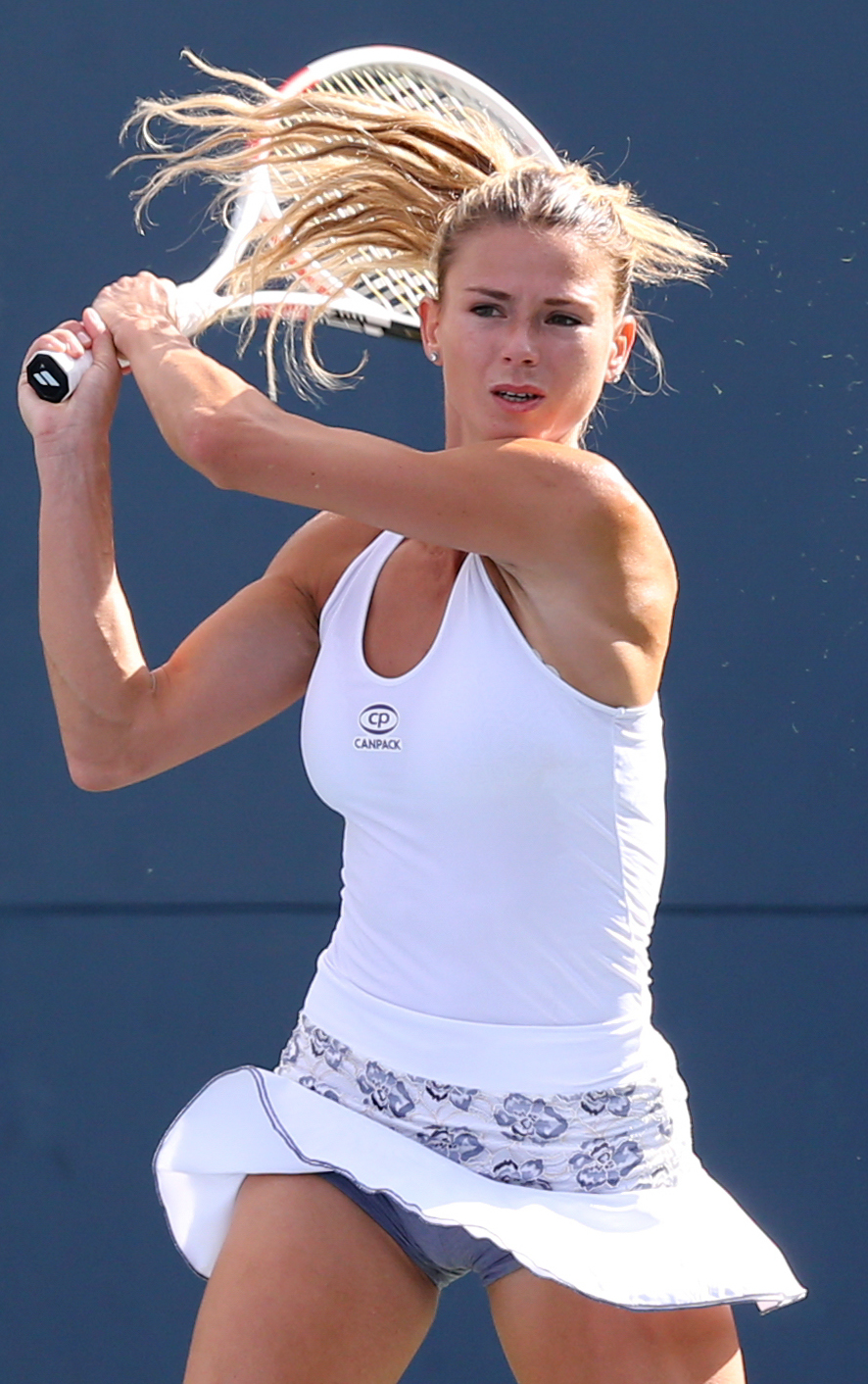
Camila Giorgi

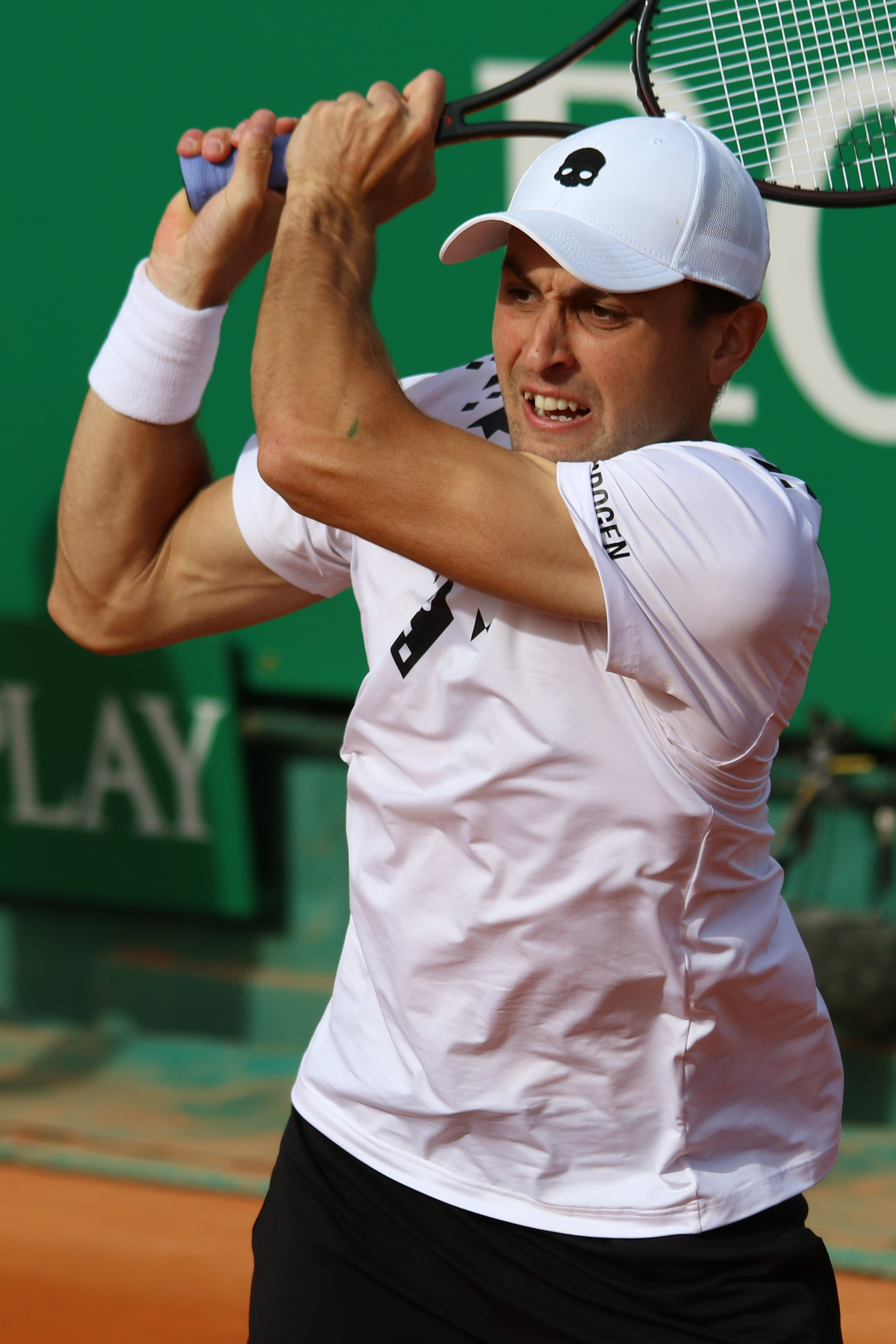
Aslan Karatsev

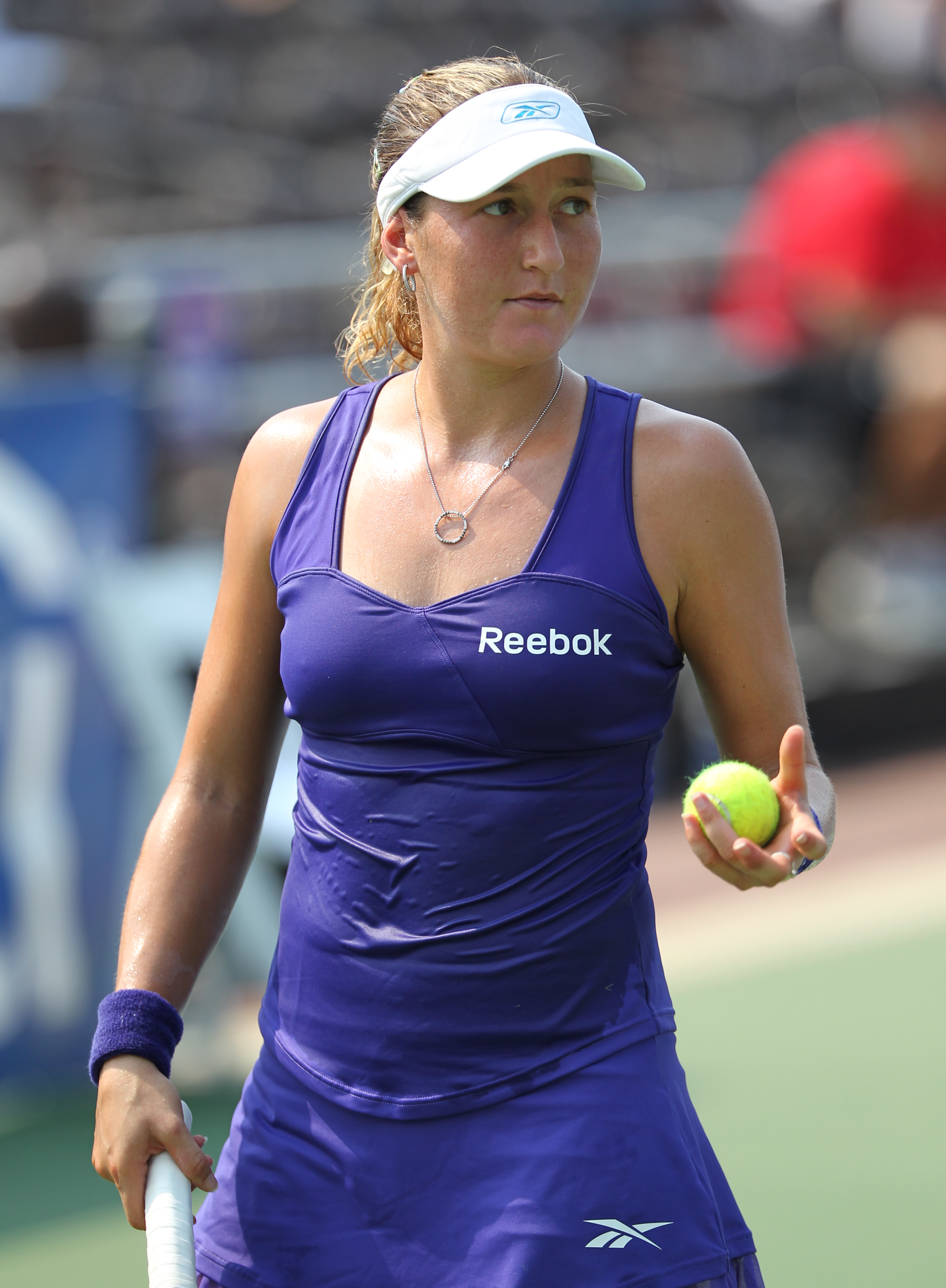
Shahar Pe'er

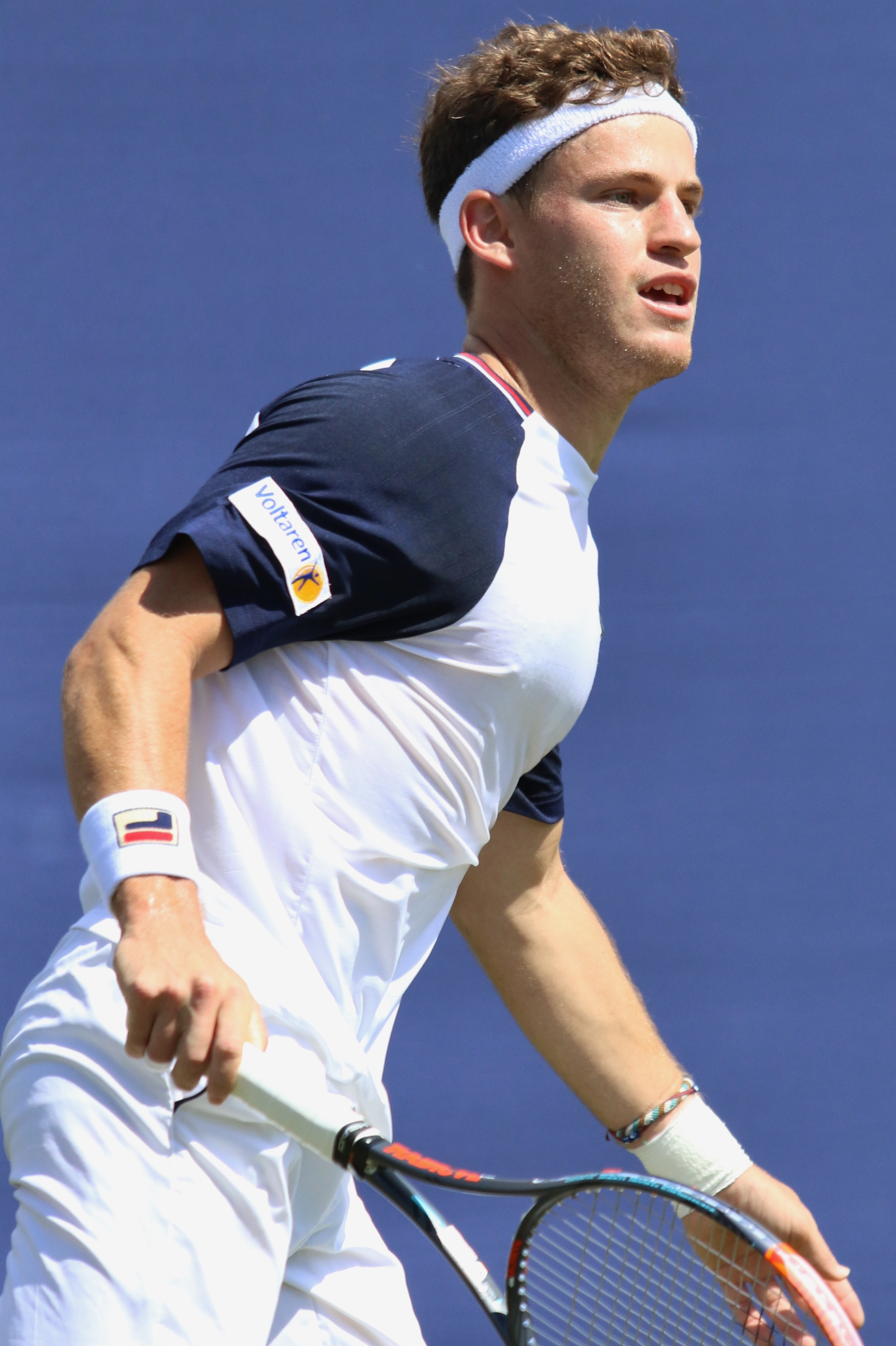
Diego Schwartzman

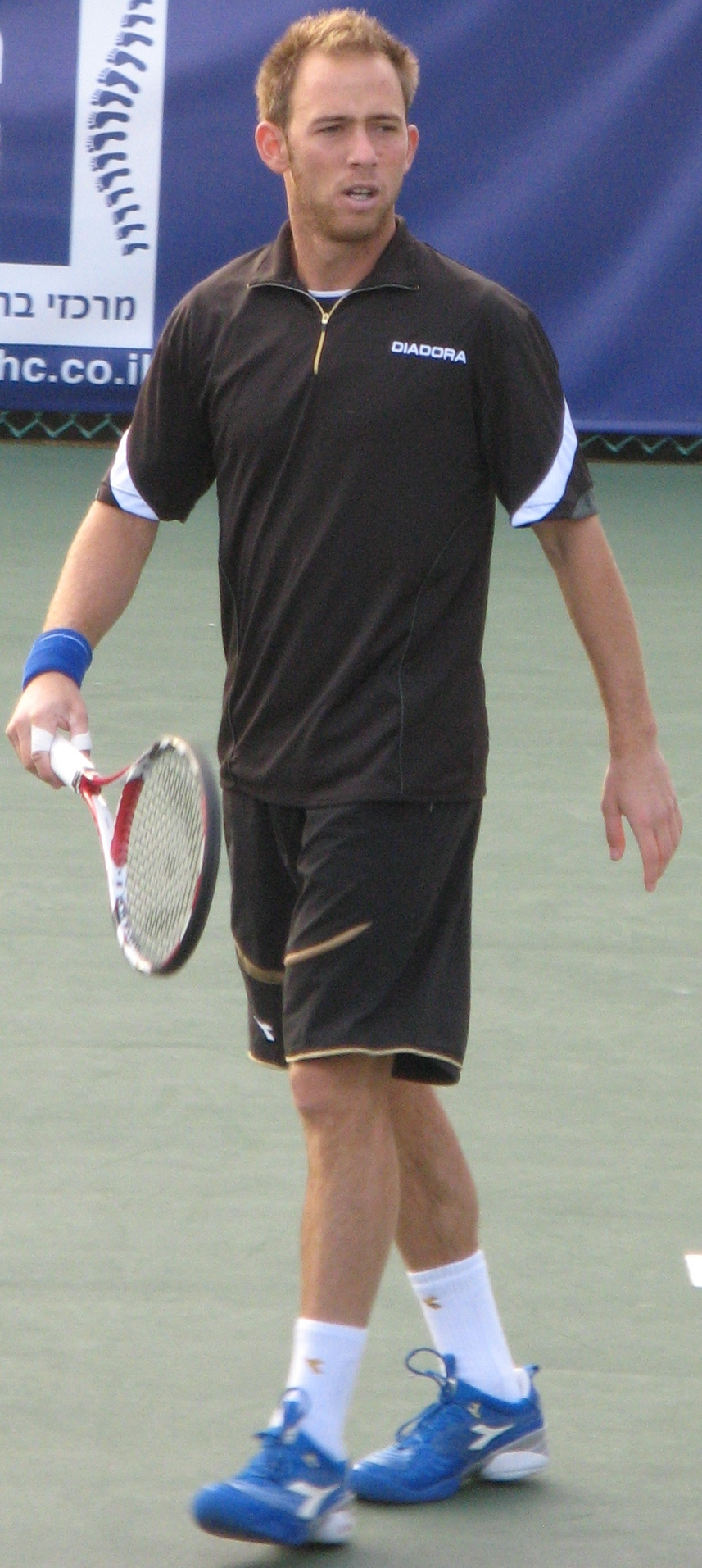
Dudi Sela

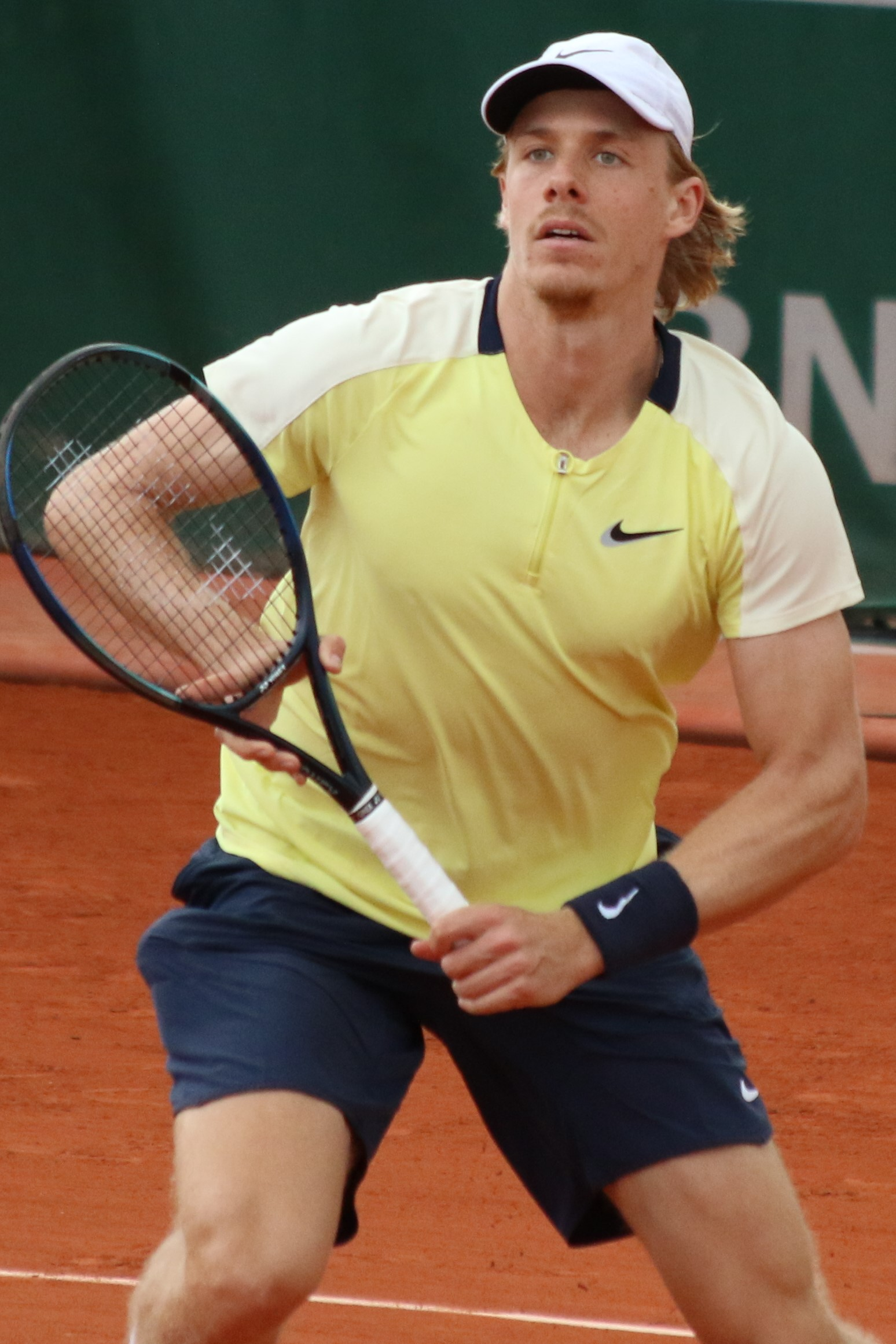
Denis Shapovalov

- Jay Berger, US, USTA boys' 18s singles champion, highest world ranking No. 7
- Gilad Bloom, Israel
- **Madison Brengle**, US, USTA girls' 18s singles champion
- Gail Brodsky, US
- Elise Burgin, US, highest world singles ranking No. 22, highest world doubles ranking No. 7
- Angela Buxton, England, won 1956 French women's doubles (with Althea Gibson) and 1956 Wimbledon women's doubles (with Gibson), highest world ranking No. 9
- Audra Cohen, US, 2007 NCAA Women's Singles champion
- Julia Cohen, US, USTA girls' 12s & 18s singles champion
- Stéphanie Cohen-Aloro, France
- Brian Dabul, Argentina, #1 junior in the world
- Pierre Darmon, France, highest world ranking No. 8
- Uberto De Morpurgo, Italy, Olympic bronze (singles), highest world ranking No. 8
- Irvin Dorfman, US
- Eva Duldig, Austria/the Netherlands/Australia
- Jonathan Erlich, Israel, won 2008 Australian Open men's doubles (with Andy Ram), highest world doubles ranking No. 5
- Gastón Etlis, Argentina
- Marcel Felder, Uruguay
- **Sharon Fichman**, Canada
- Herbert Flam, US, 2× USTA boys' 18s singles champion, Intercollegiate Tennis Association Hall of Fame, highest world ranking No. 4
- Allen Fox, US, NCAA singles and doubles champion, US champion, Intercollegiate Tennis Association Hall of Fame
- Mike Franks, US
- Brad Gilbert, US, highest world ranking No. 4, Olympic bronze (singles)
- Justin Gimelstob, US, USTA boys' 16s & 18s singles champion, won 1998 Australian Open mixed doubles (with Venus Williams) and 1998 French Open mixed doubles (with Venus Williams)
- **Camila Giorgi**, Italy
- Shlomo Glickstein, Israel
- Julia Glushko, Israel
- Grant Golden, US
- Paul Goldstein, US, USTA boys' 16s & 2× 18s singles champion
- Brian Gottfried, US, USTA boys' 12s & 2× 18s singles champion, won 1975 & 1977 French Open men's doubles (with Raúl Ramírez), and 1976 Wimbledon men's doubles (with Ramirez), highest world singles ranking No. 3, and doubles ranking No. 2
- Jim Grabb, US, won 1989 French Open men's doubles (with Richey Reneberg) and 1992 US Open men's doubles (with Patrick McEnroe), highest world doubles ranking No. 1
- Seymour Greenberg, US
- Jim Gurfein, US
- Julie Heldman, US, US girls' 15s & 18s singles champion, highest world ranking No. 5
- Helen Jacobs, US, won 1932–35 US Open singles, 1932–35 US Open women’s doubles (with Sarah Palfrey Cooke), 1934 US Open mixed (with George Lott), and 1936 Wimbledon singles, International Tennis Hall of Fame, highest world singles ranking No. 1
- Martín Jaite, Argentina, highest world ranking No. 10
- Anita Kanter, US, US girls' 18s singles champion, highest world singles ranking No. 10
- **Aslan Karatsev**, Russian-Israeli tennis player, Olympic silver (mixed doubles)
- **Sofia Kenin**, Russian-born US tennis player, 2020 Australia Open women's singles champion, highest world singles ranking #4
- Ilana Kloss, South Africa, won 1976 US Open women's doubles (with Linky Boshoff) and 1976 French Open mixed doubles (with Kim Warwick), highest world doubles ranking No. 1
- Zsuzsa Körmöczy, Hungary, won 1958 French Open singles, highest work singles ranking No. 2
- Aaron Krickstein, US, USTA boys' 16s & 18s singles champion, highest world ranking No. 6
- Steve Krulevitz, US/Israel
- Jesse Levine, Canada/US, won US Clay Court 14 nationals, USTA boys' 16s doubles championship, 2005 Wimbledon boys' doubles championship
- Harel Levy, Israel
- Evgenia Linetskaya, Israel
- Scott Lipsky, US, USTA # 1 junior in singles (1995) and doubles (1995–97); won USTA championships in 1995 boys' 14 clay court singles, 1997 boys' 16s clay court singles, 1996 and 1997 Boys' 16 doubles, and 1999 boys’ clay court doubles; won 2011 French Open mixed doubles (with Casey Dellacqua)
- **Jamie Loeb**, US, 2012 US 18s singles and doubles champion, 2015 NCAA singles champion
- Amos Mansdorf, Israel
- Bruce Manson, US
- Stacy Margolin, US
- Nicolás Massú, Chile, highest world ranking No. 9, 2× Olympic champion (singles & doubles)
- Sam Match, US
- Larry Nagler, US, 1960 NCAA tennis singles champion and doubles champion, ITA Hall of Fame
- Tzipora Obziler, Israel
- Tom Okker, Dutch, won 1973 French Open men's doubles (with John Newcombe), 1976 US Open men's doubles (with Marty Riessen), highest world ranking No. 3 in singles, and # 1 in doubles
- Noam Okun, Israel
- **Yshai Oliel**, Israel, 2016 French Open boys' doubles champion
- Shahar Pe'er, Israel, highest world ranking No. 11
- Shahar Perkiss, Israel
- Felix Pipes, Austria, Olympic silver (doubles)
- Daniel Prenn, Germany & Britain, highest world ranking No. 6
- Henry Prusoff, US
- Andy Ram, Israel, won 2006 Wimbledon mixed doubles (with Vera Zvonareva), 2007 French Open mixed doubles (with Nathalie Dechy), 2008 Australian Open men's doubles (with Jonathan Erlich), highest world doubles ranking No. 5
- Renée Richards, US
- Sergio Roitman, Argentina
- **Noah Rubin**, US, 2014 Wimbledon junior singles champion, 2014 US boys' 18s champion in singles & doubles
- Michael Russell, US, ranked No. 1 in USTA boys' 16s & 18s, all-time-record 23 USTA Pro Circuit singles titles
- Jeff Salzenstein, US, 1986 US boys' 12 Hard Court Singles & Doubles Champion
- Guy Sasson, Israel, Paralympic wheelchair tennis player; multiple-time Grand Slam champion
- Dick Savitt, US, won 1951 Wimbledon men's singles, highest world ranking No. 2
- Diego Schwartzman, Argentina, highest world ranking No. 8
- Abe Segal, South Africa
- Vic Seixas, US, won 1952 US men's doubles (with Mervyn Rose), 1953 Wimbledon men's singles, 1953 & 1955 Wimbledon mixed doubles (with Doris Hart), 1953 French mixed doubles (with Hart), 1953–55 US mixed doubles (with Hart), 1954 Wimbledon mixed doubles (with Hart), 1954 US men's, 1954 US men's doubles (with Tony Trabert), 1954–55 French men's doubles (with Trabert), 1955 Australian men's doubles (with Trabert), and 1956 Wimbledon mixed doubles (with Shirley Fry), highest world ranking No. 3
- **Dudi Sela**, Israel, 2003 French Open junior doubles champion
- Julius Seligson, US, 2× boys' 18s singles champion
- **Denis Shapovalov**, Israeli-born Canadian, highest world ranking No. 10
- Anna Smashnova, Israel, highest world ranking No. 15
- Harold Solomon, US, US boys' 18s singles champion, highest world ranking No. 5
- **Elina Svitolina**, Ukraine, Olympic bronze (singles)
- Andrew Sznajder, Canada
- Brian Teacher, US, US boys' 18s singles champion, won 1980 Australian Open singles, highest world ranking No. 7
- Eliot Teltscher, US, won 1983 French Open mixed doubles (with Barbara Jordan), highest world ranking No. 6
- Robbie Weiss, US, 1988 NCAA Division 1 Champion, All-American 1986 and 1988
- Van Winitsky, US, 1977 Junior Wimbledon and Junior US Open champion

== Track and field ==
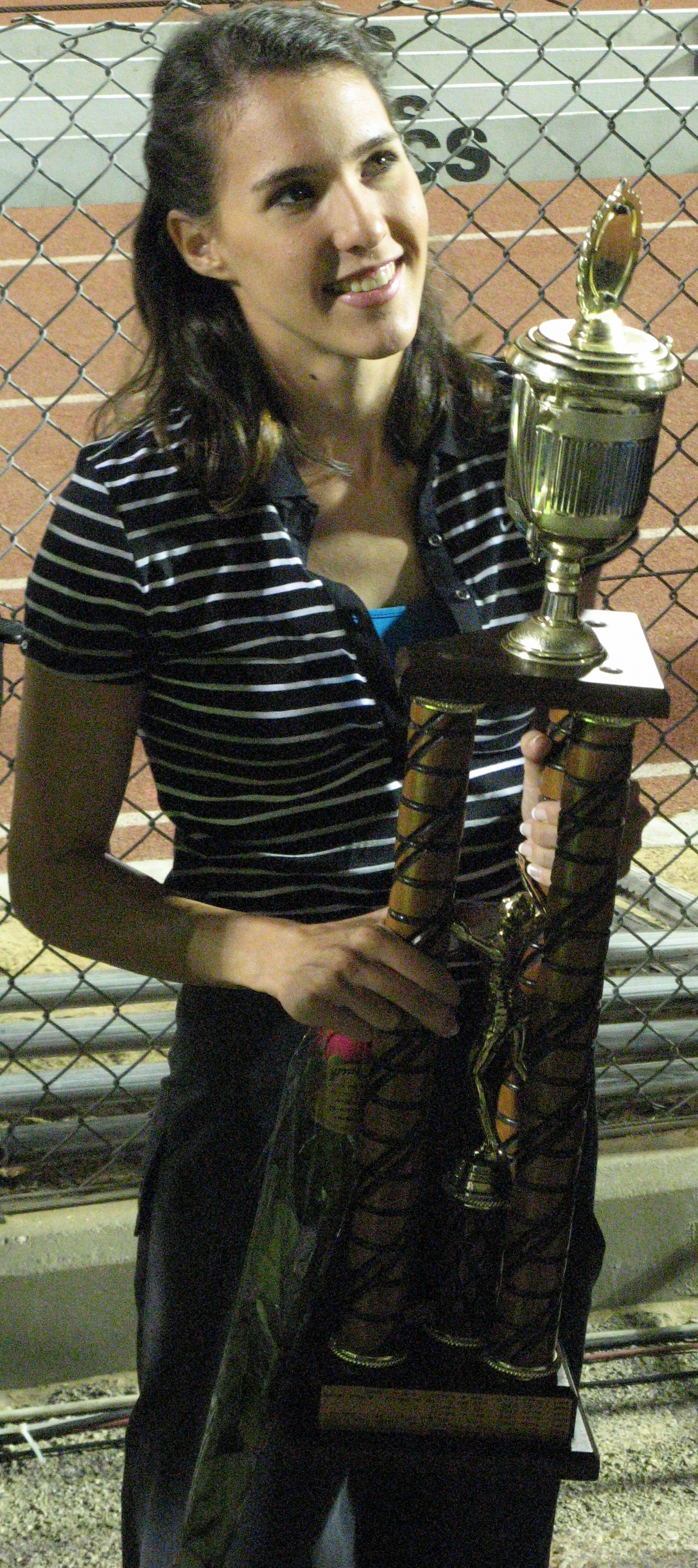
Danielle Frenkel

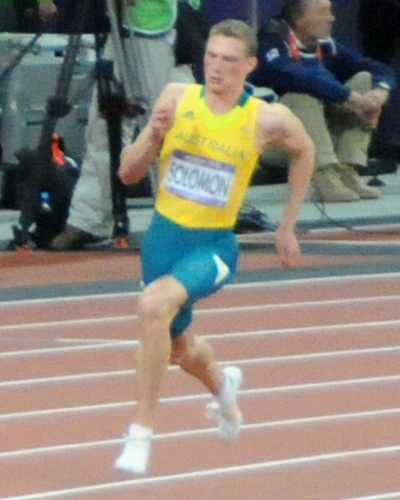
Steven Solomon

- Harold Abrahams, Britain, sprinter, Olympic champion (100 metre sprint) & silver (4 × 100 m relay)
- Sir Sidney Abrahams, Britain, Olympic long jumper
- Jo Ankier, Britain, record holder (1,500m & 3,000m steeplechase)
- Gerry Ashworth, US, Olympic champion (4 × 100m relay)
- Aleksandr Averbukh, Israel, 2002 & 2006 European champion (pole vault)
- **Gashau Ayale**, Israel, Olympic marathon
- Seteng Ayele, Ethiopia/Israel, Olympic marathon
- Gretel Bergmann, German high jumper
- Ödön Bodor, Hungary, Olympic bronze (medley relay)
- Louis "Pinky" Clarke, US, world record (100 m); Olympic champion (4 × 100m)
- Janet Cohansedgh, Iran
- Lillian Copeland, US, world records (javelin, discus throw, and shot put); Olympic champion & silver (discus)
- Ibolya Csák, Hungary, Olympic champion & European champion high jumper
- Daniel Frank, US, long jump, Olympic silver
- **Danielle Frenkel**, Israel, high jumper, 2× national champion
- Hugo Friend, US, long jump, Olympic bronze
- Jim Fuchs, US, shot put & discus, 2× Olympic bronze (shot put); 4× shot put world record holder, 2× Pan American champions (shot put & discus)
- Marty Glickman, US, sprinter & broadcaster; US Olympic team, All American (football)
- Adam Goucher, US, 3:54 miler, 2000 Olympian, 1998 NCAA Division I Cross Country Championships winner, 3rd in 2006 Prefontaine Classic 2-mile
- Milton Green, US, world records (45 yard & 60m high hurdles)
- **Ageze Guadie**, Israel, Olympic marathon runner
- Gary Gubner, US, world shot put records, weightlifter
- Lilli Henoch, Germany, world records (discus, shot put, and 4 × 100m relay); shot by the Nazis in Latvia
- Abby Hoffman, Canada, four-time Olympian (800m)
- Maria Leontyavna Itkina, Russia/URS, sprinter, world records (400 m & 220 yards (200 m), and 800m relay)
- Clare Jacobs, US, pole vaulter, Olympic bronze, world indoor record
- Harry Kane, British hurdler, held national records in the 1950s
- **Deena (Drossin) Kastor**, US, long-distance & marathon runner, US records (marathon & half-marathon); Olympic bronze (marathon)
- Elias Katz, Finland, Olympic champion (3,000 m team steeplechase) & silver (3,000 m steeplechase)
- Abel Kiviat, US, world records (2,400-yard relay & 1,500m); Olympic champion (3,000 m team) & silver (1,500m)
- Mór Kóczán, Hungary, javelin, Olympic bronze
- Svetlana Krachevskaya, URS/Russia, shot put, Olympic silver
- Shaul Ladany, Yugoslavian-born Israeli racewalker, world record holder in the 50-mile walk, former world champion in the 100-kilometer walk
- Margaret Bergmann Lambert, US, champion (high jump & shot put), British high jump champion
- Henry Laskau, German-born US racewalker, won 42 national titles; Pan American champion; 4× Maccabiah champion
- Faina Melnik, URS/Ukraine, 11 world records; Olympic discus throw champion
- Alvah Meyer, US, runner, 2 world records (60 y & 300 y); Olympic silver (100 m)
- **Jemima Montag**, Australia, 20 km race walk, Olympic 2x bronze, world championship silver
- Lon Myers, US, sprinter, world records (quarter-mile, 100-yard, 440-yard (400 m), and 880-yard)
- Zhanna Pintusevich-Block, Ukraine, sprinter, world 100m & 200m champion
- Irina Press, URS/Russia, 2× Olympic champion (80 m hurdles & pentathlon)
- Tamara Press, URS/Russia, 6 world records (shot put & discus); 3× Olympic champion (2× shot put & discus) and silver (discus)
- Myer Prinstein, US, world record (long jump); 3× Olympic champion (2× triple jump & long jump) and silver (long jump)
- Fanny "Bobbie" Rosenfeld, Canada, runner & long jumper, world record (100-yard dash); Olympic champion (4 × 100m relay) & silver (100m)
- **Steven Solomon**, Australia, sprinter, 2× Australian 400 metres champion
- Sam Stoller, US, world indoor record (60-yard dash)
- Dwight Stones, US, world record (high jump); 2× Olympic bronze
- Irena Szewińska, Poland, sprinter & long jumper, world records (100m, 200m, 400m & 4 × 100m); 3× Olympic champion (4 × 100m, 200m, 400m), 2 silver (200 m & long jump), and 2 bronze (100m & 200m)
- **Marhu Teferi**, Ethiopia/Israel, Olympic marathon
- Allan Tolmich, US, world records in the indoor 45 low hurdles, indoor 50 low hurdles, indoor 60-yard hurdles, 70 high hurdles, and 200m hurdles

== Triathlon ==
- **Joanna Zeiger**, US, triathlete, Ironman 70.3 world champion; world record (half ironman)

== Volleyball ==
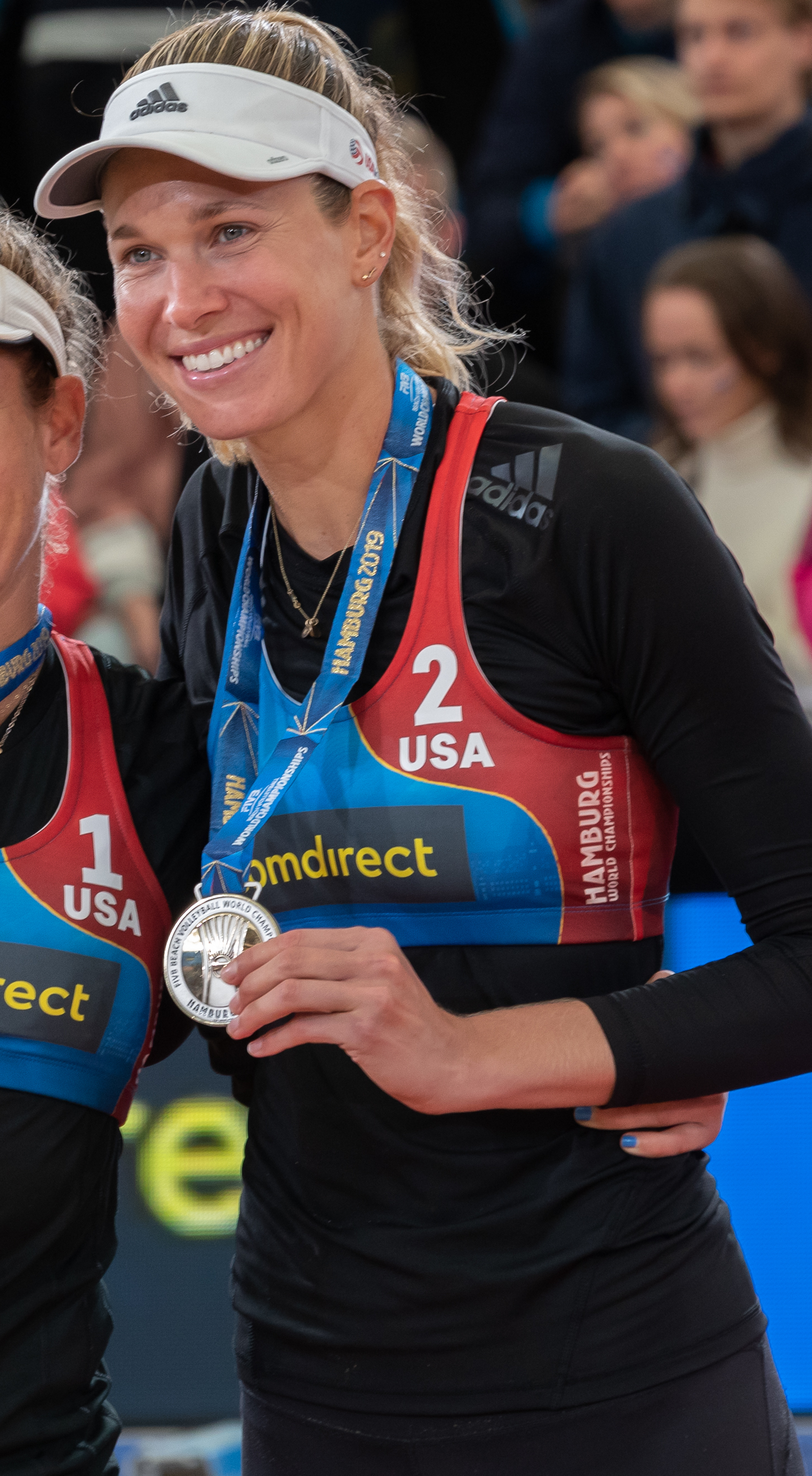
Alix Klineman

- Nelly Abramova, URS/Russia, Olympic silver
- Doug Beal, US, player & coach, national team
- Adriana Behar, Brazil, beach player; 2× Olympic silver; Pan American champion; 2× world champion
- Larisa Bergen, URS, Olympic silver
- Josh Binstock, Canada, 2x Olympian (beach volleyball)
- Yefim Chulak, URS, Olympic silver, bronze
- **Marcelo Elgarten**, Brazil, Olympic silver
- Dan Greenbaum, US, Olympic bronze
- Eliezer Kalina, Israel, 3× Paralympic gold
- Waldo Kantor, Argentina, Olympic bronze
- **Alix Klineman**, US, Olympic gold (women's beach volleyball) at the 2020 Summer Olympics
- Nataliya Kushnir, URS/Russia, Olympic silver
- Yevgeny Lapinsky, URS/Russia, Olympic champion, bronze
- Georgy Mondzolevsky, URS/Russia, 2× Olympic champion, 2× world champion
- Vladimir Patkin, URS/Russia, Olympic silver, bronze
- Igal Pazi, Israel, 2× Paralympic gold
- Bernard Rajzman, Brazil, Olympic silver; Pan American champion; world silver
- **Sam Schachter**, Canada
- Aryeh "Arie" Selinger, US & Dutch, player & coach
- Avital Selinger, Dutch, Olympic silver
- Eugene Selznick, US, 2× world champion, 2× Pan American champion, Hall of Fame
- Yuriy Venherovsky, URS, Olympic champion
- Chagai Zamir, Israel, 4× Paralympic Games champion

== Water polo ==
- Róbert Antal, Hungary, Olympic champion
- Peter Asch, US, Olympic bronze
- István Barta, Hungary, goalkeeper, Olympic champion, 1× gold, 1× Silver
- Gerard Blitz, Belgium, 2× Olympic silver, 2× bronze (one in swimming–100m backstroke), International Swimming Hall of Fame, son of Maurice Blitz
- Maurice Blitz, Belgium, 2× Olympic silver, father of Gérard Blitz
- György Bródy, Hungary, goalkeeper, 2× Olympic champion
- Henri Cohen, Belgium, Olympic silver
- Kurt Epstein, Czechoslovak national team, Olympic competitor
- Boris Goikhman, URS, goalkeeper, Olympic silver, bronze
- György Kárpáti, Hungary, 3× Olympic champion, 1× bronze
- Béla Komjádi, Hungary, player and coach
- Jillian Kraus, US, defender, World Junior, gold
- Mihály Mayer, Hungary, 2× Olympic champion, 2× bronze
- Nikolai Melnikov, URS, Olympic champion
- **Merrill Moses**, US, goalkeeper, Olympic silver, Pan American champion
- Miklós Sárkány, Hungary, 2× Olympic champion

== Weightlifting ==
- David Mark Berger, US-born Israeli, Maccabiah champion (middleweight); killed by terrorists in the Munich massacre
- Isaac "Ike" Berger, US, Olympic champion (featherweight), 2× silver; 2× Pan American champion; 23 world records
- Robert Fein, US, Olympic champion (lightweight)
- Gary Gubner, US, 4 junior world records (heavyweight); 3× Maccabiah champion (weightlifting, shot put, discus)
- Hans Haas, Austria, Olympic champion (lightweight), silver
- Ben Helfgott, Polish-born British, 3× British champion (lightweight), 3× Maccabiah champion; survived Buchenwald and Theresienstadt concentration camps, as all but one other of his family were killed by the Nazis
- Reuven Helman, Maccabiah Olympian and Israeli Weightlifting Champion
- Moisei Kas’ianik, Ukraine/URS, world champion
- Nora Köppel, Argentina, Olympian
- Naomi Kutin, US, world record in 44 kg weight class
- Darío Lecman, Argentina, Pan-American silver (middle-heavyweight)
- Edward Lawrence Levy, Great Britain, world weightlifting champion; 14 world records
- Grigory Novak, URS, Olympic silver (middle-heavyweight); world champion
- Igor Rybak, Ukraine/URS, Olympic champion (lightweight)
- Valery Shary, Byelorussia/URS, Olympic champion (light-heavyweight)
- Frank Spellman, US, Olympic champion (middleweight); world record; Maccabiah champion

== Wrestling ==
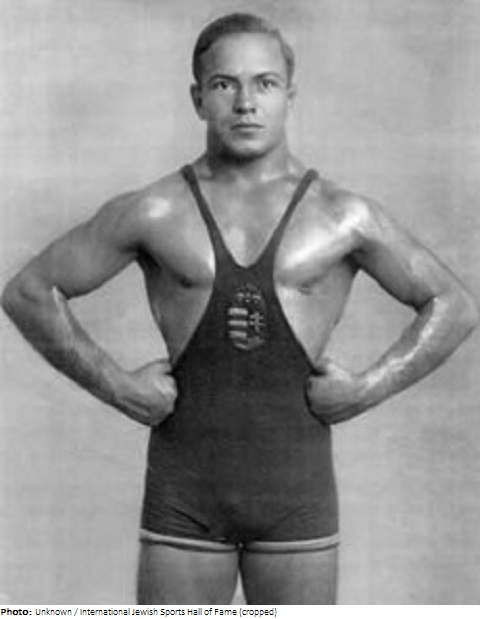
Károly Kárpáti

- Louis Baise, South Africa, won gold medals at the 1950 Maccabiah Games and the 1953 Maccabiah Games in Israel; competed in the 1952 Summer Olympics in Helsinki for South Africa
- Andy Borodow, Canada, Commonwealth games gold medallist
- Lindsey Durlacher, US, world bronze (Greco-Roman)
- **Amit Elor**, US, 2024 Olympic champion and 8x world champion, at age 18 became the youngest world champion in American free-style wrestling history, and at 20 the youngest Olympic champion
- Grigoriy Gamarnik, Ukraine/URS, world champion (Greco-Roman lightweight), world championship gold and silver
- Samuel Gerson, Ukraine-born US, Olympic silver (freestyle featherweight)
- Boris Maksimovich Gurevich, URS, Olympic champion (Greco-Roman flyweight), 2× world champion
- Boris Mikhaylovich Gurevich, URS, Olympic champion (freestyle middleweight), 2× world champion
- Nickolaus "Mickey" Hirschl, Austria, 2× Olympic bronze (heavyweight freestyle and Greco-Roman)
- Garry Kallos, Hungary-born Canada, Pan-American champion
- Oleg Karavaev, URS, Olympic champion (Greco-Roman bantamweight), 2× world champion
- Károly Kárpáti (also "Károly Kellner"), Hungary, Olympic champion (freestyle lightweight), silver
- Abraham Kurland, Denmark, Olympic silver (Greco-Roman lightweight)
- Len Levy, US, NCAA national champion
- Fred Meyer, US, Olympic bronze (freestyle heavyweight)
- Fred Oberlander, Austria, Britain, and Canada; world champion (freestyle heavyweight); Maccabiah champion
- Max Ordman, South Africa, competed in the Olympic Games of 1960 (freestyle light-heavyweight), Gold 1950 Maccabiah
- Yakov Punkin, URS, Olympic champion (Greco-Roman featherweight)
- Samuel Rabin, Great Britain, Olympic bronze (freestyle middleweight)
- David Rudman, URS, 6× national wrestling champion and 6× sambo champion, sambo world champion, 2× European judo champion
- Mark Schultz, US, Olympic champion (freestyle 82 kg), gold
- Richárd Weisz, Hungary, Olympic champion (Greco-Roman super heavyweight)
- Henry Wittenberg, US, Olympic champion (freestyle light-heavyweight), silver

== Jewish sports halls of fame ==
Jewish sports halls of fame
- International Jewish Sports Hall of Fame (Netanya, Israel)
- National Jewish Sports Hall of Fame and Museum (US)
- Southern California Jewish Sports Hall of Fame

== See also ==
- List of Jewish Olympic medalists
- List of Jews in sports (non-players), a list of Jewish sports commissioners, managers, coaches, officials, owners, promoters, and sportscasters

== Bibliography ==
=== General works ===
- Encyclopedia of Jews in Sports, Bernard Postal, Jesse Silver, Roy Silver, Bloch Pub. Co., 1965
- The Jewish Athlete: A Nostalgic View, Leible Hershfield, s.n., 1980
- From the Ghetto to the Games: Jewish Athletes in Hungary, Andrew Handler, East European Monographs, 1985, ISBN 0-88033-085-6
- The Jew in American Sports, Harold Uriel Ribalow, Meir Z. Ribalow, Edition 4, Hippocrene Books, 1985, ISBN 0-88254-995-2
- The Jewish Athletes Hall of Fame, B. P. Robert Stephen Silverman, Shapolsky Publishers, 1989, ISBN 0-944007-04-X
- The International Jewish Sports Hall of Fame, Joseph M. Siegman, SP Books, 1992, ISBN 1-56171-028-8
- Ellis Island to Ebbets Field: Sport and the American Jewish Experience, Peter Levine, Oxford University Press US, 1993, ISBN 0-19-508555-8
- The Jewish Child's Book of Sports Heroes, Robert Slater, Jonathan David Publishers, 1993, ISBN 0-8246-0360-5
- Sports and the American Jew, Steven A. Riess, Syracuse University Press, 1998, ISBN 0-8156-2754-8
- Jewish Sports Legends: the International Jewish Hall of Fame, 3rd Ed, Joseph Siegman, Brassey's, 2000, ISBN 1-57488-284-8
- The 100 Greatest Jews in Sports: Ranked According to Achievement, B. P. Robert Stephen Silverman, Scarecrow Press, 2003, ISBN 0-8108-4775-2
- Great Jews in Sports, Robert Slater, Jonathan David Publishers, 2004, ISBN 0-8246-0453-9
- Judaism's Encounter with American Sports, Jeffrey S. Gurock, Indiana University Press, 2005, ISBN 0-253-34700-9
- Emancipation through Muscles: Jews and Sports in Europe, Michael Brenner, Gideon Reuveni, translated by Brenner, Reuveni, U of Nebraska Press, 2006, ISBN 0-8032-1355-7
- Jewish Sports Stars: Athletic Heroes Past and Present, David J. Goldman, Edition 2, Kar-Ben Publishing, 2006, ISBN 1-58013-183-2
- The Big Book of Jewish Athletes: Two Centuries of Jews in Sports – a Visual History, Peter S. Horvitz, Joachim Horvitz, S P I Books, 2007, ISBN 1-56171-927-7
- The Big Book of Jewish Sports Heroes: An Illustrated Compendium of Sports History and The 150 Greatest Jewish Sports Stars, Peter S. Horvitz, SP Books, 2007, ISBN 1-56171-907-2
- Jews, Sports, and the Rites of Citizenship, Jack Kugelmass, University of Illinois Press, 2007, ISBN 0-252-07324-X
- Day by Day in Jewish Sports History, Bob Wechsler, KTAV Publishing House, 2008, ISBN 1-60280-013-8
- Jews and the Sporting Life, Vol. 23 of Studies in Contemporary Jewry, Ezra Mendelsohn, Oxford University Press US, 2009, ISBN 0-19-538291-9

=== Baseball ===
- Jewish Baseball Stars, Harold Uriel Ribalow, Meir Z. Ribalow, Hippocrene Books, 1984, ISBN 0-88254-898-0
- The Jewish Baseball Hall of Fame: a Who's Who of Baseball Stars, Erwin Lynn, Shapolsky Publishers, 1986, ISBN 0-933503-17-2
- The Big Book of Jewish Baseball: An Illustrated Encyclopedia & Anecdotal History, Peter S. Horvitz, Joachim Horvitz, SP Books, 2001, ISBN 1-56171-973-0
- Jews and Baseball: Entering the American Mainstream, 1871–1948, Burton Alan Boxerman, Benita W. Boxerman, McFarland, 2006, ISBN 0-7864-2828-7
- The New Big Book of Jewish Baseball: An Illustrated Encyclopedia & Anecdotal History, Peter S. Horvitz, Joachim Horvitz, Perseus Distribution Services, 2007, ISBN 1-56171-821-1
- The Baseball Talmud: The Definitive Position-by-Position Ranking of Baseball's Chosen Players, Howard Megdal, Collins, 2009, ISBN 0-06-155843-5
- Jews and Baseball: The Post-Greenberg Years, 1949–2008, Burton Alan Boxerman, Benita W. Boxerman, McFarland, 2010, ISBN 0-7864-2828-7
- American Jews and America's Game, Larry Ruttman, University of Nebraska Press, 2013, ISBN 978-0-8032-6475-5

=== Boxing ===
- The Jewish Boxers Hall of Fame, Ken Blady, SP Books, 1988, ISBN 0-933503-87-3
- When boxing was a Jewish sport When Boxing Was a Jewish Sport, Allen Bodner, Praeger, 1997, ISBN 0-275-95353-X

=== Chess ===
- The Great Jewish Chess Champions, Harold U. Ribalow, Meir Z. Ribalow, Hippocrene Books, 1987, ISBN 0-87052-305-8

=== Olympics ===
- Foiled, Hitler's Jewish Olympian: the Helene Mayer Story, Milly Mogulof, RDR Books, 2002, ISBN 1-57143-092-X
- Jews and the Olympic Games: The Clash between Sport and Politics: with a complete review of Jewish Olympic medallists, Paul Taylor, Sussex Academic Press, 2004, ISBN 1-903900-88-3
- Jews and the Olympic Games; Sport: Springboard for Minorities, Paul Yogi Mayer, Vallentine Mitchell, 2004, ISBN 0-85303-451-6
