= Mushy Callahan =

American boxer (1905–1986)

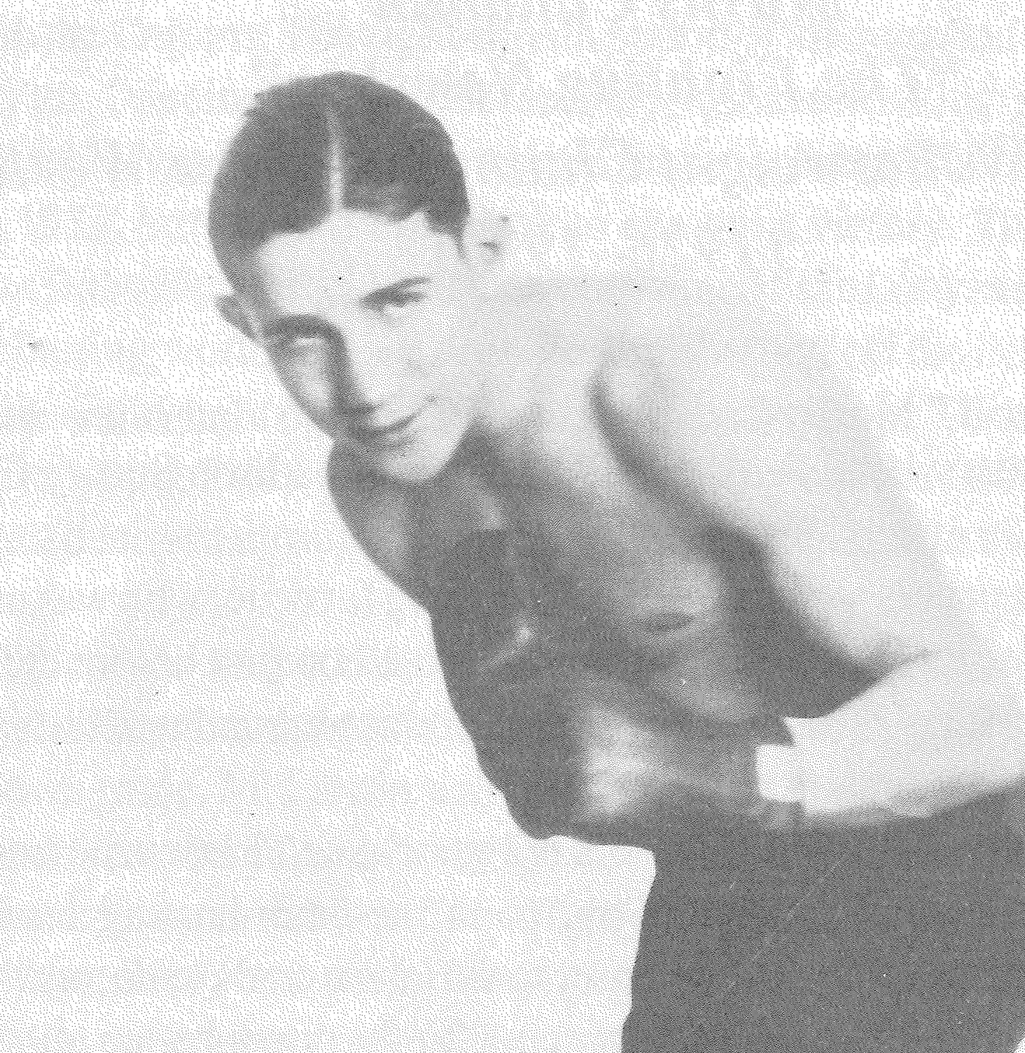
- Callahan, c. 1920
- Born: Vincent Morris Scheer; November 3, 1905; New York City, New York, U.S.
- Died: June 14, 1986 (aged 80); Los Angeles, California, U.S.
- Burial place: Holy Cross Cemetery, Culver City, California
- Known for: World Light-Welterweight Boxing Champion (1926–1930)
- Spouse: Leonora Summers (m. 1934; died 1976)
- Children: 1
- Boxing career
- Nickname: The Fighting Newsboy
- Nationality: United States
- Height: 5 ft 7.5 in (1.71 m)
- Weight: Welterweight
- Reach: 70 in (178 cm)
- Stance: Orthodox

Boxing record
- Total fights: 68
- Wins: 49
- Win by KO: 22
- Losses: 16
- Draws: 3

Mushy Callahan (November 3, 1905 – June 14, 1986) was the 1926–1930 light welterweight world champion of boxing. After retiring from boxing in 1932, Callahan refereed hundreds of matches, and he had a 30-year career in Hollywood, taking small roles in movies, most with boxing themes, as well as working as a stuntman, trainer and boxing adviser on movie sets.

== Early life and start in boxing ==
Callahan was born Vincent Morris Scheer in Manhattan's Lower East Side. His father was a produce merchant. His family moved to the heavily Jewish neighborhood of Boyle Heights District in Los Angeles from New York when he was two. He was into amateur boxing by ten, and when he finally started professional boxing in 1924, four rounds were the limit in California, so his progress in gaining experience was limited.

He took the ring name of Mushy Callahan, discarding his more ethnic-sounding name, as most Jewish boxers did at the turn of the century. He was nicknamed "Mushy" from his Hebrew name Moishe, or Moses. According to Callahan, he took his last name from an Irish fight promoter at his Newsboy's boxing club, in hopes it would keep his family from finding out he was boxing. Callahan was a great counter puncher and possessed a fine defense.

In 1925, when ten-round fights were legalized in California, Callahan ran through a number of opponents, including Russel LeRoy and Pal Moran, knocking both out in three rounds. He also fought James Red Herring and Spug Myers. Callahan fought Ace Hudkins to a draw in their first meeting on September 16, 1925, in Olympic Auditorium in Los Angeles, and then defeated Hudkins in ten rounds on November 14, 1925, in Vernon, California, despite having broken bones in both hands.

== Light Welterweight crown and later boxing career ==
On September 21, 1926, Callahan fought Pinky Mitchell for Mitchell's World Light Welterweight crown. Mitchell was the first champion light welterweight, a class created in 1922. At the time of the fight, he had held the title almost continuously from its inception in 1922 until his fight with Callahan. When the two boxers met, few recognized the legitimacy of a championship in this weight class. Nevertheless, Callahan beat Mitchell over ten rounds in Vernon, California, and won the title.

Callahan said in an interview of his subsequent title bout with Andy DiVodi, "My biggest thrill came when I fought Andy DiVodi in Madison Square Garden on March 14, 1927. The New York papers were full of DiVodi...I knocked him out in the second round." The National Boxing Association recognized the bout as being for the World Super Lightweight title. Callahan defended his title again on May 31, 1927, against Spug Myers at Wrigley Field in Chicago and then on May 28, 1929, against Fred Mahan in Los Angeles. The NBA again recognized the ten-round points decision win over Myers as for the World Super Lightweight title.

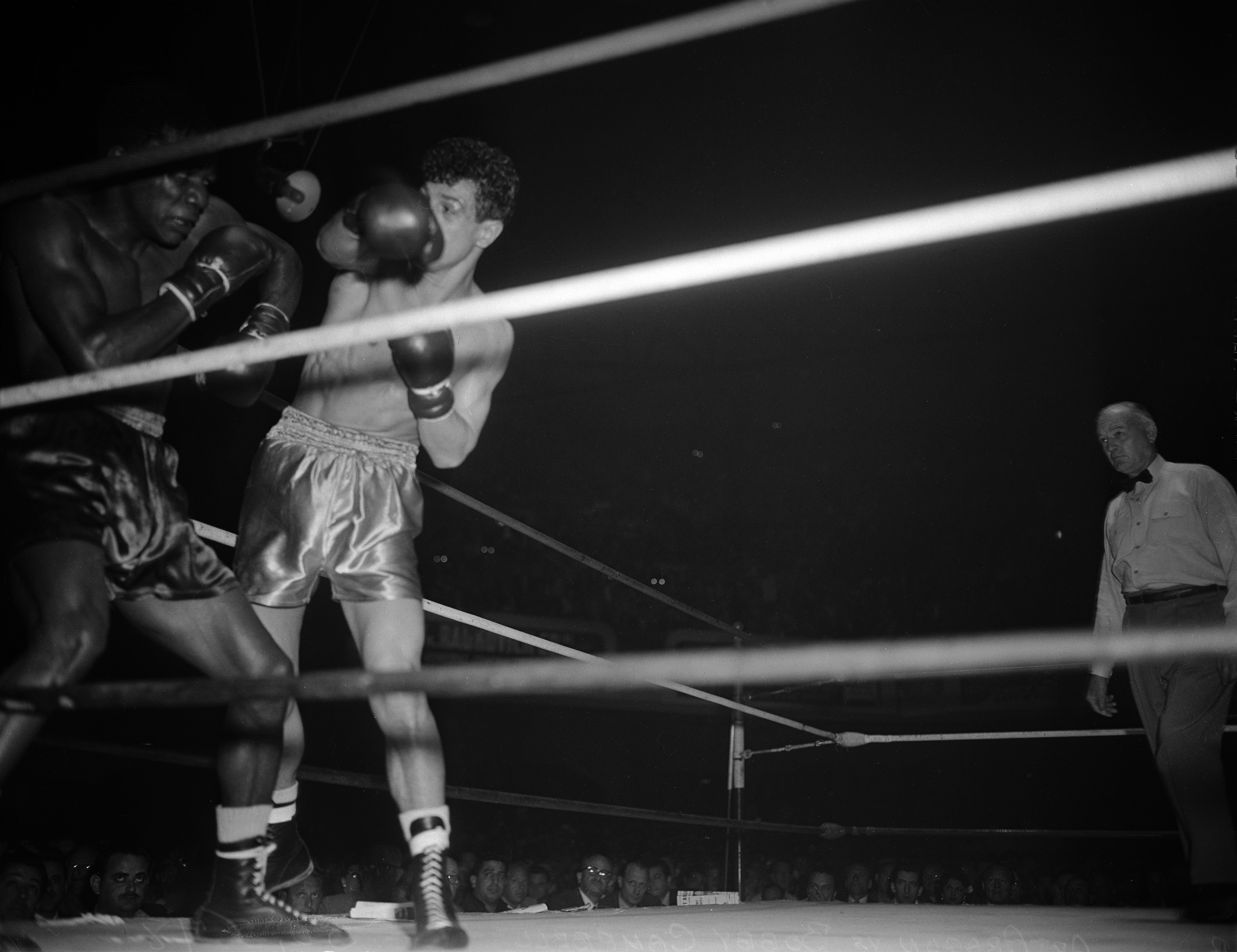
Boxer Art "Golden Boy" Aragon (right) fights Bobby Campbell in the ring with Mushy Callahan as referee, c. 1950.

Callahan also fought a variety of non-title fights from 1927 to 1929. On July 13, 1927, Callahan lost a bout to Sergeant Sammy Baker by TKO in the ninth round. Baker had weighed in at 144 pounds (65 kg), putting him four pounds over the junior welterweight limit, allowing Callahan to keep his title despite the loss. Four month later, on November 22, Callahan lost badly to Olympic champion Jackie Fields in a ten-round decision, although, again, he retained his title because Fields was overweight for the class.

Of his March 28, 1928, ten-round win over Dick Hoppe at the Olympic Auditorium, the Montreal Gazette wrote, that he had won "in the opinion of ring siders seven of the ten rounds." Callahan had previously lost to Hoppe in ten rounds on November 10, 1927, in Hollywood Legion Stadium. Hoppe was not the quality of competition he would later face in Jackie Berg.

On July 24, 1929, Callahan first fought British boxer Jack "Kid" Berg in a non-title fight. The ten-round unanimous decision in favor of Berg at Ebbets Field in Brooklyn, New York, did not bode well for Callahan's chances in a title match with Berg. On February 18, 1930, Callahan put his title on the line against "Kid" Berg at Royal Albert Hall in London, England. Berg knocked him out in the tenth round of the fifteen-round bout to take the title. Berg held it for the remainder of the year. There is some dispute as to whether the Light Welterweight title was actually on the line in this fight. The NBA had stripped Callahan of its version of the Light Welterweight title before the Berg fight. Furthermore, at the time of the Berg fight, Britain did not recognize the light welterweight division. The New York State Athletic Commission recognized the Berg–Callahan fight as being for the Light Welterweight title, however, and Berg won NBA recognition in 1931.

== Retirement from boxing and movie career ==
Callahan retired from professional boxing around 1932. Though he could take a punch, his decline might be explained by the abdominal injuries he received in his 1927 bout with Baker and from which he never fully recovered. Callahan also suffered injuries to his hands early in his career that contributed to his retirement.

Shortly after his last fight, Callahan began to referee boxing matches, working more than 400 matches between December 1932 until November 1960. He stayed close to the Los Angeles area as a referee, so he could pursue his career in the movie industry during this period. After gaining a decade of experience as a referee, Callahan simultaneously worked as a boxing judge for over 100 fights mostly in the Los Angeles area, including four state championships, between 1941 and 1960.

On October 9, 1937, Callahan was scheduled to box in a benefit exhibition at Legion Stadium in Los Angeles for Wad Wadheim, a fight promoter who had suffered a stroke. Among the 50 or so boxers to participate were triple World Champion Henry Armstrong, Callahan's opponents Jackie Fields, Ace Hudkins, and Jack Silver, as well as Young Jack Thompson, Abe "The Newsboy" Hollandersky, Fidel La Barba, ex-Middleweight champion Al McCoy, Jim Jeffries, and Maxie Rosenbloom.

As a fighter, Callahan had met Jack Warner of Warner Bros. and complained to him about the quality of on-screen boxing and made suggestions about how to make it more authentic looking. Warner suggested Callahan come work for him once he retired from boxing. In 1933, Callahan took Warner up on the offer, and he was placed in charge of the Warner Bros. prop department. He soon was tapped by studios to choreograph boxing scenes, including the original 1937 and Elvis's 1962 remake of Kid Galahad and the 1938 sequel The Kid Comes Back, and to train and condition actors. He served as technical adviser on a number of films, include Warner's 1942 Gentleman Jim in which he also did fight choreography, Warner's 1948 Whiplash, Columbia Pictures' 1948 Leather Gloves, and Ventura Pictures' 1957 The Crooked Circle. He also appeared in bit parts in at least a dozen films, most commonly as a referee. As a stuntman on Paramount's 1953 War of the Worlds, Callahan suffered burns while performing one of the first full-body fire stunts on film.

Among the actors he trained were Montgomery Clift (From Here to Eternity), James Dean (Rebel Without a Cause), Kirk Douglas (Champion), Errol Flynn (Gentleman Jim), James Earl Jones (The Great White Hope), Burt Lancaster (Jim Thorpe – All-American), Anthony Quinn (Requiem for a Heavyweight), and Elvis Presley (Kid Galahad).

== Honors ==
Callahan was inducted into the World Boxing Hall of Fame posthumously in 1989.

== Personal life ==
In 1934, Callahan married Leonora Summers (née Lillian Hill, 1897–1976), a former silent film actress, in Los Angeles. That same year, he converted to Catholicism. Their son, Michael Anthony Callahan, was ordained as a Jesuit priest in 1967.

He died in June 1986 following a long illness and was buried in Holy Cross Cemetery in Culver City, California.

== Partial filmography ==
Film performances
Year	Title	Role
1932	Madison Square Garden	himself
1934	The Personality Kid	Biff Sullivan
1935	The Irish in Us	Referee
1939	They Made Me a Criminal	Schwimmer
1949	House of Strangers	Referee
1951	Iron Man	Allentown Arena Referee
1953	Stop, You're Killing Me	No Nose
1953	War of the Worlds	Burning Soldier
1955	The Bamboo Prison	P.O.W.
1956	The Leather Saint	Referee
1956	World in My Corner	Referee
1957	Designing Woman	Referee
1963	The Nutty Professor	Cab Driver
1964	Robin and the 7 Hoods	Gangster
Source: Mushy Callahan at the American Film Institute Catalog

Film Production Credits
Year	Title	Role
1942	Gentleman Jim	Trainer, Fight Choreography
1948	Leather Gloves	Technical Advisor
1948	Whiplash	Technical Advisor
1949	Champion	Technical Advisor
1949	House of Strangers	Technical Advisor
1957	Designing Woman	Technical Advisor
1957	The Crooked Circle	Technical Advisor
1962	Kid Galahad	Technical Advisor
1970	The Great White Hope	Technical Advisor
Source: Mushy Callahan at the American Film Institute Catalog

== See also ==
- List of light welterweight boxing champions
- List of select Jewish boxers

Achievements
Preceded by Pinky Mitchell	World Light Welterweight Champion; September 21, 1926 – February 18, 1930	Succeeded by Jackie "Kid" Berg
