= Jack Silver (boxer) =

American boxer (1903–1994)

Personal information
- Nickname: Long John Silver
- Nationality: American
- Born: John Silverstein; August 16, 1903 San Francisco, California, U.S.
- Died: July 26, 1994 (aged 90) California, U.S.
- Height: 5 ft 9 in (1.75 m)
- Weight: Lightweight; Welterweight

Boxing career
- Stance: Orthodox

Boxing record
- Total fights: 112
- Wins: 57
- Win by KO: 6
- Losses: 22
- Draws: 32
- No contests: 1

Jack Silver (August 16, 1903 – July 26, 1994) was a Navy Pacific Fleet Champion around 1921, a Pacific Coast Lightweight boxing Champion in 1924 and a contender for the Pacific Coast Welterweight Championship in 1926.

In 1925, he was the World's third ranked lightweight. He was reputed by one source to have fought 237 bouts with 200 wins. In his career he fought champions Mushy Callahan, Young Corbett III, Jackie Fields, and Young Jack Thompson. He defeated Callahan in a stunning upset on July 5, 1926, just months before Callahan would take the World Light Welterweight Championship. After his retirement from professional boxing, he was a California boxing referee and judge for over twenty years.

== Early life ==
Silver was born one of eight children, on August 16, 1903, in the rough Portola district of San Francisco, California. His father, originally from Vienna, was a tailor for ladies garments. His brother Joey Silverstein (Not to be confused with Brooklyn boxer Joey Silvers) became a Welterweight boxer. Like many boxers of his era, Jack grew up selling newspapers to earn extra money for his family. He entered the Navy around 1921, at the age of eighteen, where he gained many of his boxing skills during his two-year stint. By the time of his discharge he had earned the title of Pacific Fleet Champion. While in the Navy on June 13, 1922, he fought aboard the USS California (BB-44), flagship of the Pacific fleet, and a vessel known for hosting top boxing and athletic competitions.

== Boxing career ==
On August 17, 1923, he took the City of San Francisco Lightweight title from Bobby Allen in four rounds at the large Dreamland Rink where he was to fight regularly. Silver was a studied boxer who was solid in the fundamentals. He had an accurate and lightning fast left jab, and an efficient right which could knock an opponent on the mat, but rarely knock one out. He used his long reach to his advantage and was more a studied scientific boxer than a power hitter. His long slim build was rather unusual for a championship boxer.

From 1922 to 1923, Silver fought at the Dreamland Rink in San Francisco for 52 consecutive weeks as a headliner. In early 1924, according to boxing writer Ken Blady, Silver defeated Lou Paluso of Salt Lake city for the Pacific Coast Lightweight Title. He fought Paluso again for the title on March 29, 1926, in a twelve-round draw match in Salt Lake City. According to the Deseret News, "the local pride (Paluso) was superior at infighting, while the coast ace (Silver) had an advantage with his long reach and was at his best on long distance slugging."

Defending his Pacific Coast Lightweight Title on February 23, 1925, he fought Joe Benjamin at Recreation Park in San Francisco. The fight attracted 20,000 spectators, and was at the time the largest attendance for a lightweight bout in California history. Silver was down in the third round for a count of five, and Benjamin ultimately won the controversial ten-round decision. This fight was significantly an elimination bout for the World Lightweight Title.

On April 16, 1926, Silver defeated Oakland Jimmy Duffy, Pacific Coast Welterweight Champion 1922–25, in ten rounds at his favorite haunt Dreamland Rink in San Francisco. Author Ken Blady wrote that Silver won the Pacific Coast Welterweight Championship as a result of this or an earlier fight with Duffy.

On July 5, 1926, Silver faced the next Light Welterweight World Champion Mushy Callahan in Ewing Field in San Francisco before a huge crowd of 18,000, with Silver impressively winning the referee's decision and every round. Callahan would hold the Light Welterweight Championship from September 21, 1926, until 1930. Reflecting on the Callahan fight two years later, the San Jose News wrote "In his prime Silver was the fastest Jr. Welterweight on the Pacific Coast, giving Mushy Callahan the surprise of his life...Callahan... expected to find a pushover, but was handed a lacing by the San Francisco battler."

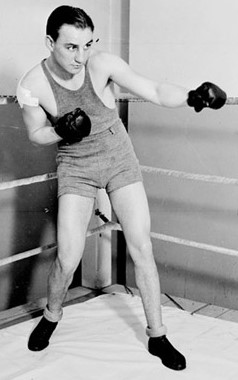
Jackie Fields, 1929 World Welterweight Champion

By late 1926, Silver was still a competent boxer, who now fought closer to the Jr. welterweight division, but no longer as a top ranked contender. On December 21, 1926, he lost to the former Olympic champion Jackie Fields in a four-round TKO at Dreamland Rink in San Francisco. Silver lost to 1933 World Welterweight Champion Young Corbett III on June 7, 1927, in a close ten round bout in Fresno, California.

== Retirement from professional boxing and work as boxing judge ==
Partly as a result of his losses to Young Corbett III, and Jackie Fields, Silver retired from professional boxing in 1929. He said in an interview "I simply lost my touch." In a disappointing loss to 1930 Welterweight Champion, Young Jack Thompson, on September 28, 1926, in an eighth-round TKO in Los Angeles, Silver's jaw was broken.

Silver married Bess O'Connor around 1932, and had a long marriage with a large family.

On October 9, 1937, Silver was scheduled to box in a benefit exhibition at Legion Stadium in Los Angeles for Wad Wadheim, a fight promoter who had suffered a stroke. Among the fifty or so boxing greats that participated were triple World Champion Henry Armstrong, Silver's opponents' Jackie Fields, Mushy Callahan, and Young Jack Thompson, Abe 'The Newsboy" Hollandersky, Fidel La Barba, ex-Middleweight champion Al McCoy, Jim Jeffries, and Maxie Rosenbloom.

Silver worked as a boxing judge and referee after his retirement from professional prizefighting. His lengthy career as a California boxing referee stretched from 1939 to 1962 and he refereed about 80 matches, including two USA sanctioned State Titles. He simultaneously worked as a California boxing judge as well from 1947 to 1968, judging the California State Light Heavyweight Title on August 21, 1968, in Oakland. During his career he judged at least forty-two boxing matches according to his BoxRec record.

In his retirement from boxing, he also worked as a Salesman for the Ranier Brewing Company.

During the 1940s, when boxing and refereeing jobs were scarce, Silver became a sought after boxing instructor in Hollywood, where he helped tutor actors James Cagney and Ronald Reagan in the fistic arts.

== Boxing honors ==
He was elected into the California Boxing Hall of Fame in 1972, and was a member of the New Jersey Boxing Hall of Fame as well.

== Family life ==
What delighted Silver most of all were his 26 great-grandchildren fulfilling the Old Testament precept, "Thou shalt be fruitful and multiply."
