= The Personality Kid =

1934 film by Alan Crosland

- Theatrical release poster
- Directed by: Alan Crosland
- Screenplay by: F. Hugh Herbert; Erwin Gelsey
- Story by: Gene Towne; C. Graham Baker
- Produced by: Robert Presnell Sr.
- Starring: Pat O'Brien; Glenda Farrell; Claire Dodd
- Cinematography: William Rees
- Edited by: Terry O. Morse
- Music by: Leo F. Forbstein
- Production company: Warner Bros. Pictures
- Distributed by: Warner Bros. Pictures
- Release date: July 7, 1934
- Running time: 68 minutes
- Country: United States
- Language: English

The Personality Kid is a 1934 American drama film directed by Alan Crosland, starring Pat O'Brien and Glenda Farrell. The film is based on a story by Gene Towne and C. Graham Baker. It was released by Warner Bros. Pictures on July 7, 1934.

== Plot ==
Joan McCarty is married to boxer Ritzy McCarty, who has had some minor success because of his active footwork in the ring and colorful personality. His crowd-pleasing technique catches the eyes of promoters Gavin and Stephens. Under their management, Ritzy starts fighting in better venues and attracts the attention of Patricia Merrill. Patricia and Ritzy began an affair, which his wife Joan tolerates. When Ritzy learns that he has been winning because his opponents were paid to lose the fights, and that Joan agreed to these conditions, he leaves her.

Ritzy is suspended for fighting in a fixed fight. Patricia loses interest in him because he is no longer successful. He takes a job attracting customers to a health lecture. Patricia is there and invites him to visit her, but he finds a pregnant Joan waiting at Patricia's apartment. Ritzy, now determined to provide a good life for his child, accepts an offer to lose a fight. However, Ritzy fights well and defeats his opponent after hearing that his wife has given birth to a boy. Impressed by the fight, Stephens visits him in the hospital and offers to put Ritzy back in the ring again, this time with legitimate fights.

== Cast ==
- Pat O'Brien as Ritzy McCarty
- Glenda Farrell as Joan McCarty
- Claire Dodd as Patricia Merrill
- Robert Gleckler as Gavin
- Henry O'Neill as Stephens
- Thomas E. Jackson as Rankin
- Arthur Vinton as McPhail
- Clarence Muse as Shamrock
- Clay Clement as Duncan

== Production ==
Pat O'Brien, who had boxed at Marquette University, was trained for the film by boxer Jackie Fields. Myron Schlecter, the boxing champion of the USS Arizona, and former champion Mushy Callahan were O'Brien's opponents in the film.

The film's prerelease title was One-Man Woman.

== See also ==
- List of boxing films
