= Across the Pacific (1926 film) =

1926 film

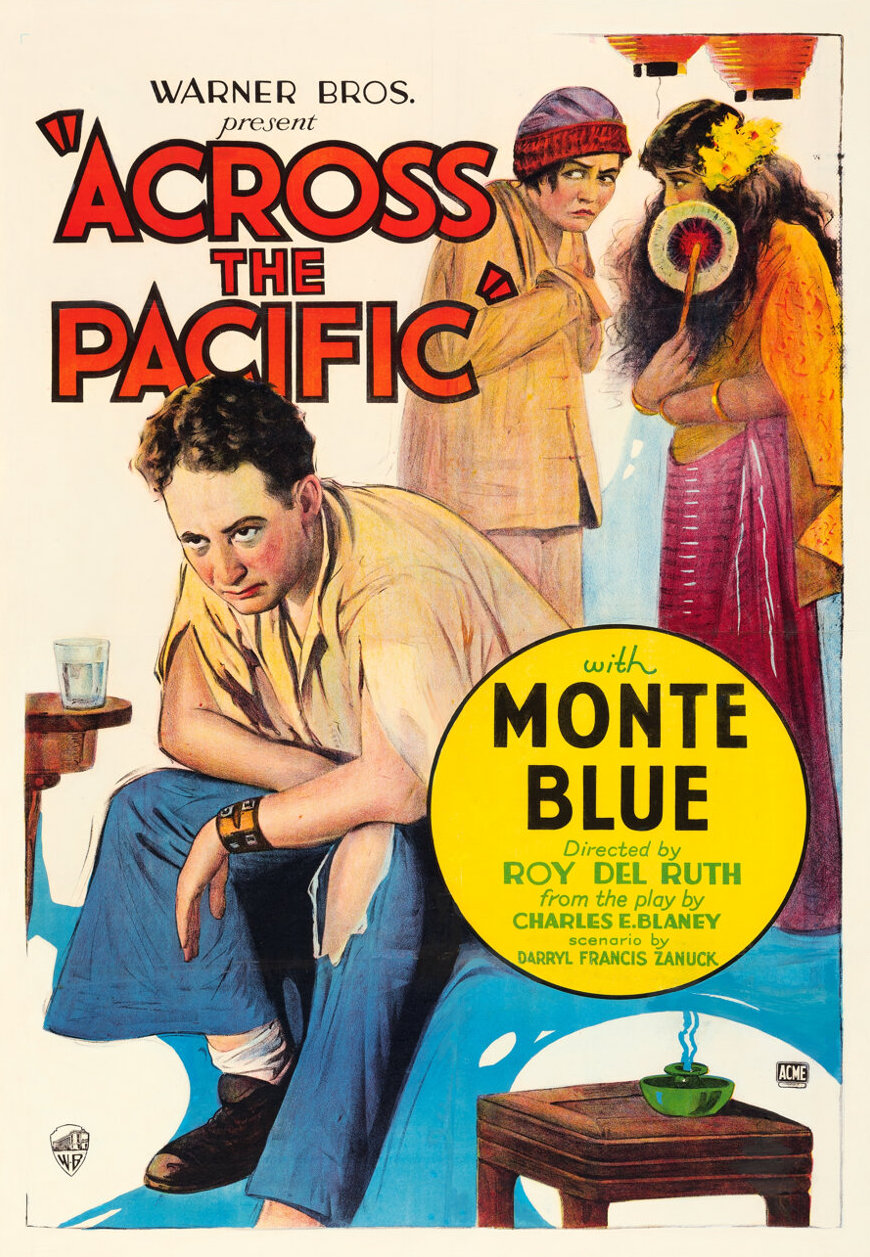
- Film poster
- Directed by: Roy del Ruth
- Written by: Darryl Zanuck (adaptation)
- Based on: Across the Pacific; 1904 novel by Charles Blaney
- Produced by: Darryl Zanuck
- Starring: Monte Blue
- Cinematography: Byron Haskin; Frank Kesson
- Distributed by: Warner Bros. Pictures, Inc. (as A Warner Brothers Production)
- Release date: October 2, 1926 (United States)
- Running time: 78 minutes
- Country: United States
- Language: Silent (English intertitles)
- Budget: $214,000
- Box office: $352,000

Across the Pacific is a 1926 American silent romantic adventure film produced by Warner Bros., directed by Roy del Ruth and starring Monte Blue. It was based on a 1900 play by Charles Blaney and J. J. McCloskey. The play had been filmed before in 1914 with Dorothy Dalton. It is unknown, but the film might have been released with a Vitaphone soundtrack.

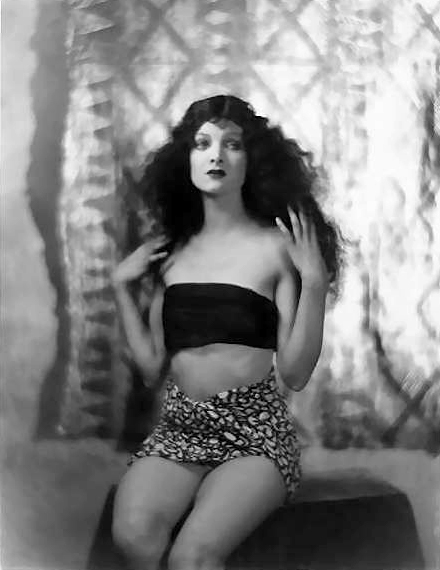
Myrna Loy as Roma in the film.

== Plot ==
After his father brings disgrace on his family, Monte joins the Spanish–American War (April–August 1898) and goes with his regiment to the Philippines. Although he has a sweetheart back home, Claire Marsh, he is enlisted to romance a mixed race girl, Roma, who knows the whereabouts of the Philippine leader Emilio Aguinaldo. Monte must keep up the ruse even when Claire comes to the islands to visit him. He finally gets the information that he needs but not before he is branded a deserter and then must prove his mettle on the battlefield. When the insurrection is squelched and Aguinaldo is captured, Monte is able to explain everything to Claire, and the couple are reunited.

== Cast ==
- Monte Blue as Monte
- Jane Winton as Claire Marsh
- Myrna Loy as Roma
- Charles Stevens as Emilio Aguinaldo
- Tom Wilson as Tom
- Walter McGrail as Captain Grover
- Herbert Prior as Colonel Marsh
- Edgar Kennedy as Corporal Ryan
- Theodore Lorch as Aguinaldo's Agent
- Abraham Jacob Hollandersky as old tough in bar scene

== Box office ==
According to Warner Bros. records the film earned $252,000 domestically and $100,000 foreign.

== Preservation ==
With no prints of Across the Pacific located in any film archives, it is a lost film.

== See also ==
- List of early Warner Bros. sound and talking features
