= Abraham Jacob Hollandersky =

American boxer (1887–1966)

Abe Hollandersky
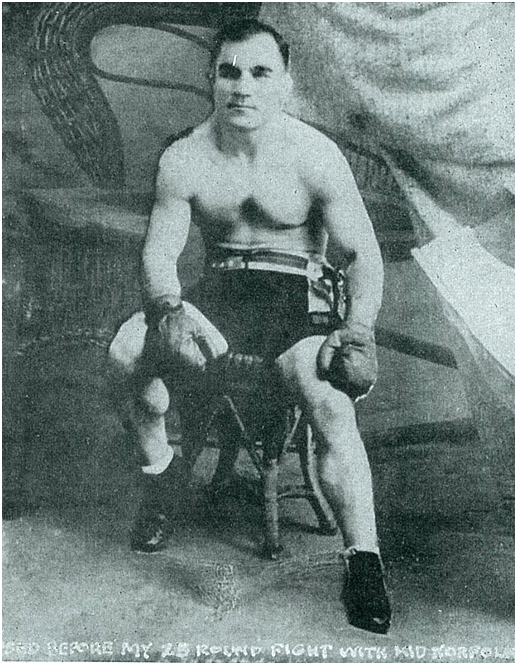
- Before Norfolk fight, 1914

Personal information
- Nickname: Abe the Newsboy
- Nationality: American
- Born: Abraham Jacob Hollandersky; December 3, 1888 Berznick, Suwalk, Russia; Currently Northeastern Poland
- Died: November 1, 1966 (aged 77) San Diego, California, U.S.
- Height: 5 ft 4 in (1.63 m)
- Weight: Welterweight

Boxing career
- Stance: Orthodox

Boxing record
- Total fights: 100 on BoxRec verified (Up to 1000 with onboard and training matches)
- Wins: 25
- Win by KO: 7
- Losses: 40
- Draws: 26
- No contests: 9

Abe "The Newsboy" Hollandersky (December 3, 1888 – November 1, 1966) was an American professional boxer who won the Panamanian national Heavyweight Title when he defeated Californian Jack Ortega in nine rounds in Panama City on May 30, 1913. American congressmen, Naval personnel, and canal workers were among the crowd of nearly two thousand who watched Hollandersky gain victory over an opponent who outweighed him by over thirty-five pounds. The New York Times announced Hollandersky's best known win the following morning.

Hollandersky was reputed to have fought an unprecedented 1,039 boxing matches between 1905 and 1918, as well as 387 wrestling matches. The record of 1,039 bouts from Hollandersky's autobiography was featured for decades in the Guinness Book of World Records, Ripley's Believe it or Not, The Ring Record Book, and hundreds of short newspaper articles made available as Associated Press fillers, appearing most frequently between 1930 and 1970. The most common fight total cited by Hollandersky was 1,039, but as Abe fought additional exhibitions he increased the count, thus a few sources that interviewed him after the publication of his book quote higher totals.

In his role as newsboy to the Navy he met, worked or corresponded with four Presidents, at least two Secretaries of the Navy, and many high-ranking admirals, while documenting his meetings and correspondence. Several sources also credit him with taking an American or World Welterweight Wrestling Championship in December 1907. Hollandersky's claim to the championship was a result of a victory over "Young Roeber" who wrestled frequently in New York and held several wrestling weight division titles.

== Early life ==
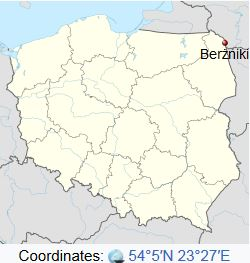
Berzniki in Northeastern Poland

Hollandersky was born to Jewish parents Charles and Celia Hollandersky in the small town of Berżniki, in Northeastern Poland bordering on Lithuania, then in the province of Suwałki, Russia. Like many Jewish families in their part of the world, the Hollanderskys struggled to survive in the grips of poverty with little opportunity to improve their fate. Abe held memories of his mother washing clothes barefoot in the snow of Berzniki.

Though his book and the ship's manifest from his first entry into the United States give his birth year as 1888, Hollandersky cited December 3, 1887, as his birth date in his passport application, and other official documents. The ship's manifest for his arrival in the United States in 1899 likely gives the more accurate birth date of 1888, as it was provided by his mother on entry to the United States when Abe was 11. Abe's mother Celia, raised by a religious leader, created strong Old Testament values in Abe that were reflected in the moral tone of much of his autobiography. Celia's father, Mowza (Moses) Finkielsztejn, was a "Podskolnik", a part-time temple leader who could fill in as a Rabbi or teach Hebrew. Pogroms, famine, restrictions on career opportunities, the inability to own or purchase property, and highly limited access to public secondary education caused by Tsar Alexander III's May Laws of 1882, encouraged the family to leave Russia. According to Abe's autobiography, many of the residents of Berzniki were evicted from their homes by edict of the Russian government if they could not prove they were land owners.

=== Flight from Russia, arrival in America ===
According to genealogist Marlene Silverman, Falk Hollandersky, Abe's Uncle, emigrated to America at age forty-three, arriving in New York around 1886 accompanied by his wife Sarah Feyga whom he had married in a small ceremony in Berznicki in 1865. Falk farmed in the summer and in the winter worked in a largely handmade garment and tailoring shop in Chesterfield, Connecticut, specializing in pants. By 1892, in New London, he opened a tailoring and clothing shop with his son-in-law Simon Plattus that eventually included the sale of quality fur coats he often made himself.

Four of Abe's siblings, two boys and two girls, died of malnutrition in Berzniki prior to Abe's departure. Departing Russia around the age of nine or ten, Hollandersky headed to Berlin, Germany and then Manchester, England with his mother Celia and older brother Sol. In Manchester, Celia worked in the textile industry to raise money for passage to America. Manchester was a natural choice as her cousin Solomon Hollandersky, Uncle Falk's son, had already emigrated there before coming to America. Hollandersky's father Charles, a tailor, had preceded him to America to find work, at some point plying his trade with his brother Falk in New England. Charles sent money from New England to Abe's mother so his family could eventually afford passage to America, but became blind before they were able to leave Berzniki. Uncle Falk and his wife Sarah Feyga provided parental support to Abe at times in his youth.

Falk Hollandersky's wife Sarah and Abe's mother Celia were sisters, daughters of assistant Rabbi Mowza (Moses) Finkielsztejn (born c. 1812). The two sisters in turn married the Hollandersky brothers Falk and Charles.

Abe, his mother Celia, and brother Sol first arrived in America in 1899. Hollandersky arrived with little or no public schooling. He took boxing training at a local YMCA, and continued to sell newspapers as a youth, having begun by selling them in Manchester, England, around age eight or nine.

=== Youthful trespassing offense in New London ===
By the age of seventeen, Hollandersky was wrestling professionally in New London, and at sixteen, in September 1904, was found guilty of trespassing on the New York, New Haven, and New London Railroad. The New London judge found Abe was the "ringleader of a gang of boys who made themselves a nuisance by hanging around the station," and they may have hitched the occasional ride on the boxcars. For a boy who chose boxing as a profession, this was a minor offense, but Hollandersky may have suffered from a lack of adult supervision having never attended public school, and having a blind father who was limited in the role he could take in his upbringing. The following month, according to The Day, Hollandersky headed Southwest to Louisville, Kentucky where he had family.

== Encounter with President Roosevelt ==
Abe in crouch on left, boxing on the USS Mayflower

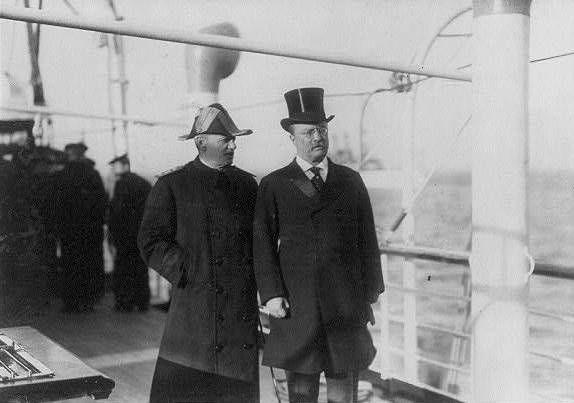
Roosevelt (right) and Admiral Robley Evans (left) aboard the USS Mayflower during fleet review, September 1906

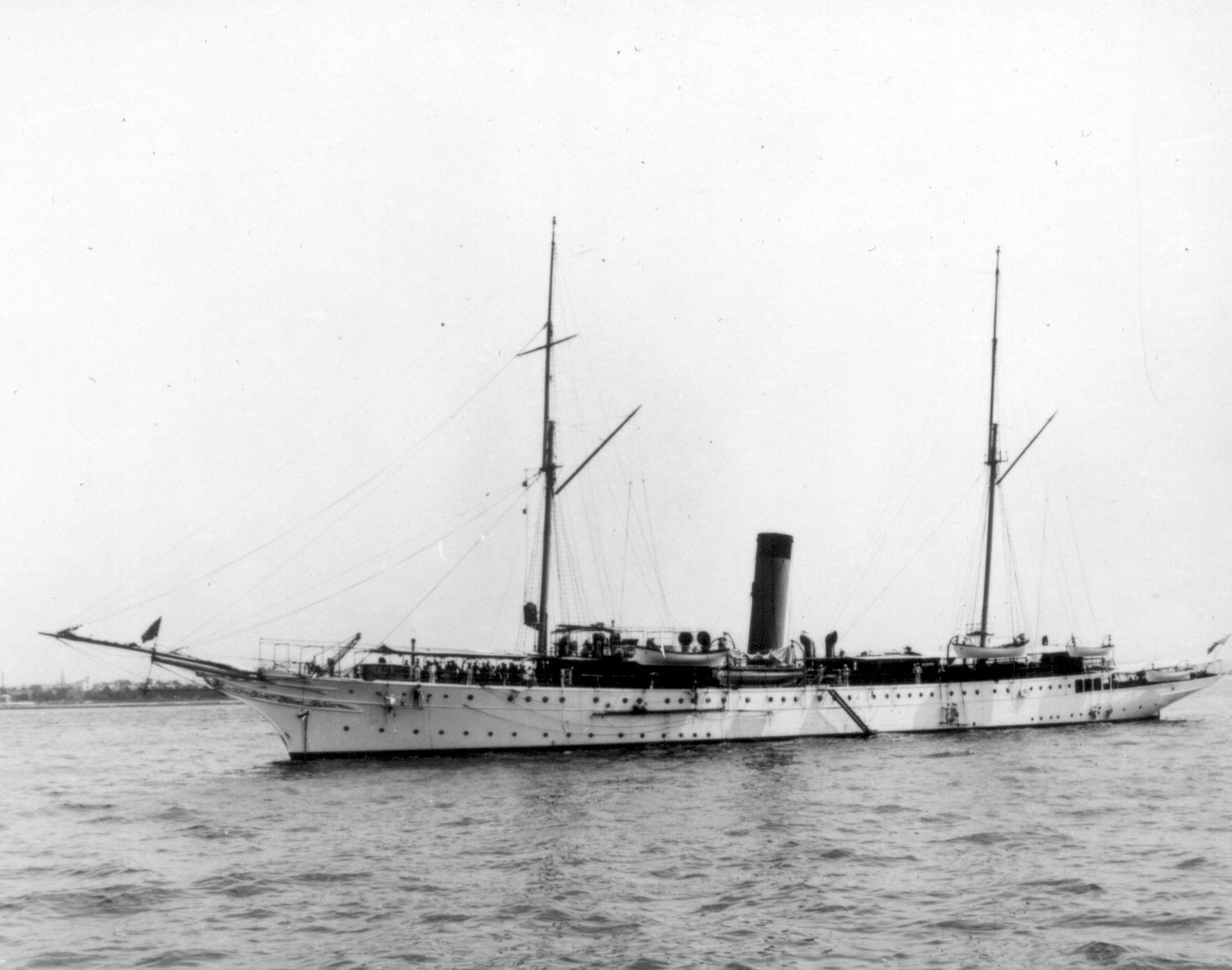
Presidential yacht USS Mayflower circa 1905

After he tried to sell a newspaper to Teddy Roosevelt aboard the presidential yacht USS Mayflower in September 1906, Roosevelt had Admiral Robley D. Evans, Commander of the North Atlantic Fleet, create the official unpaid title "Newsboy of the Navy," for Hollandersky, giving him the right to sell papers to any Navy ship and travel to any destination on U. S. Naval vessels. According to Hollandersky's autobiography, their meeting took place during Roosevelt's presidential review of the Naval fleet in New York's Oyster Bay, off Long Island, September 2–4, 1906, and was a pivotal point in Abe's career. Hollandersky had a busy boxing schedule in New York that year which kept him near Oyster Bay, and Roosevelt had likely come from his home off the Bay. Hollandersky and the President engaged in a brief and friendly exchange of light blows after Roosevelt waved off his Secret Service bodyguards. Their meeting took place on the Starboard deck of the presidential yacht after Roosevelt saw Abe's cauliflower ear, and asked if he was a boxer. The President had boxed competitively at Harvard, and took a sincere interest in the eighteen-year-old newsboy who was keen on selling his papers to the fleet.

According to historian Abraham Hoffman, Charles J. Bonaparte, Secretary of the Navy, several Secret Service bodyguards, Edith Roosevelt, the President's wife, and the well-known entrepreneur Cornelius Vanderbilt were also aboard the Mayflower during Roosevelt's September fleet review. A signed letter from Hollandersky's book authenticates a relationship between him and President Roosevelt. The letter extends an invitation from the President for Abe to visit him at the White House. Correspondence also is documented from Roosevelt's wife Edith. Around 1908, while selling papers, Hollandersky claimed to have boarded one of Admiral Evans' old commands, the USS Connecticut, flagship of the Great White Fleet, while Roosevelt was again aboard. After meeting Roosevelt, Hollandersky boxed aboard the presidential yacht Mayflower to entertain members of Congress, and later briefly met President Woodrow Wilson aboard the Mayflower off New London.

== Naval contacts and work with the US Navy ==
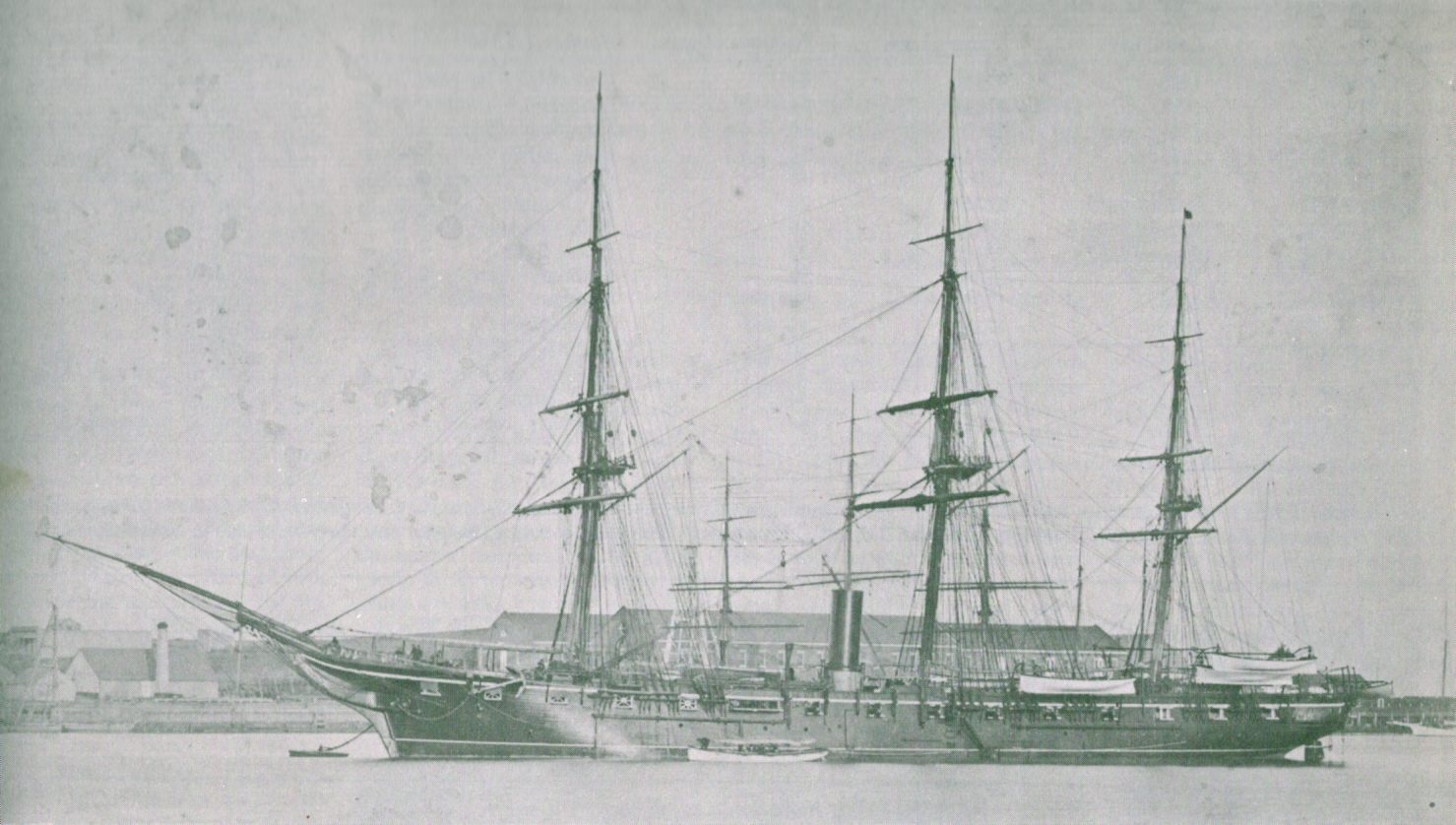
USS Hartford

During his early work with the Navy, Abe sold newspapers to ships off the New London harbor. While serving U. S. Naval Academy Midshipmen during their annual summer cruise from Annapolis in July and August in New London's Gardiner Bay, he met many future admirals. Around 1906, Abe met Captain George Fried who would become famous in the late 1920s for the valiant rescues of the French ship Antinoe and the Italian freighter Florida while he commanded ocean liners of the United States Lines.

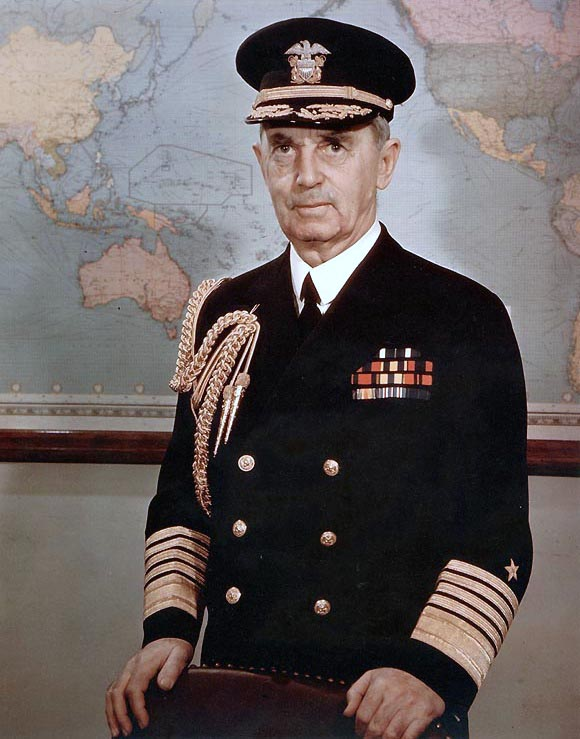
Admiral Leahy, Chief of Naval Operations, circa 1945

When they first met, Fried was a young fledgling sailor serving his first Naval assignment aboard the old civil war era schooner USS Hartford, where he learned the art of navigation. Fried and Hollandersky maintained an acquaintance for many years. Admiral J. M. Reeves, a pioneer in the use of Naval air warfare, was one of the many high-ranking officers who claimed to have been sold newspapers by Hollandersky very early in his career, and throughout his very distinguished years of service.

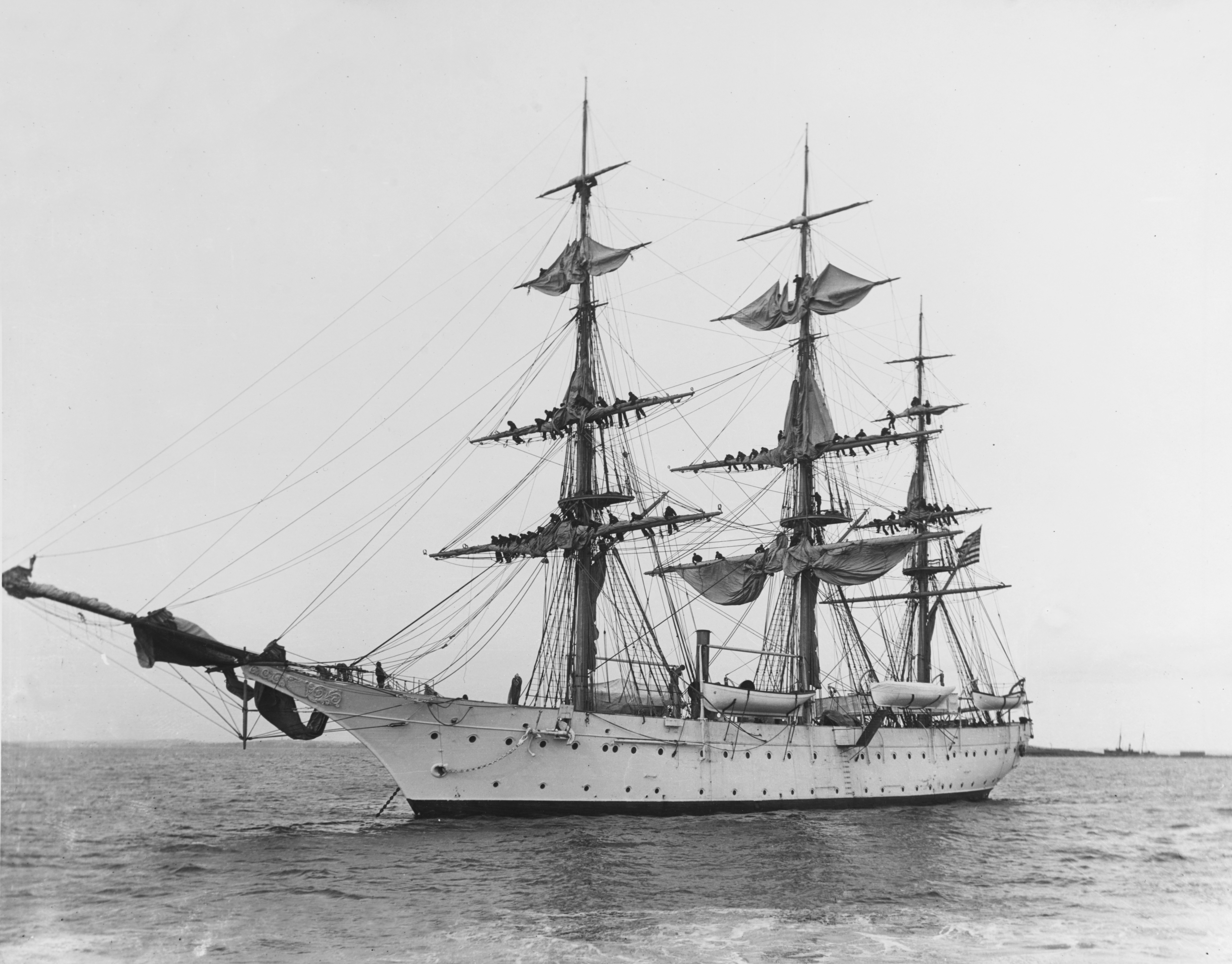
USS Chesapeake, later USS Severn

Future Commodore Harry Asher Badt was one of the many Naval Academy midshipman who met Abe around 1905 in New London during the Academy's annual summer cruise from Annapolis. Badt was aboard the USS Chesapeake, a three-masted, wooden-hulled, fully rigged ship, renamed the USS Severn in 1905. Abe claimed to have again sold papers aboard the Severn while she was in port near Ancon, Panama around late 1913. Badt was part of the US Naval Academy's class of 1908, according to their yearbook the Lucky Bag, during the period when Lieutenant William D. Leahy was beginning his Naval career as a teaching assistant in Physics and Electrical Engineering.

Twenty-five years later, Admiral Leahy, while serving as Chief of Staff to Franklin Roosevelt, would write a brief review of Abe's book in March 1930 and on December 7, 1943, would sign his Award of Merit for recruiting 1700 men for the Navy in the ramp up for WWII. Leahy had formerly served as the Chief of Naval Operations from 1937 to 1939. Also signing the award in 1943 were Fleet Admiral C.W. Nimitz, largely responsible for the Navy's success at the Battle of Midway in 1942, and James Forrestal, Secretary of the Navy. Both would send photographs to Abe for his book, with Admiral Nimitz's photo depicting him posing with Abe before a map.

=== Fighting a kangaroo and bear ===
Abe boxed a huge muzzled bear named "Custer" around 1905 at Hubert's Dime Museum on 14th Street in New York City. Harry Houdini would later perform at the same Hubert's. With his friend, Irish heavyweight boxer and ex-Navy man Tom Sharkey acting as referee, Abe claimed to have knocked out the bear, who fell from the ring damaging a grand piano, infuriating the museum's manager and amazing the large audience who included several Tammany Hall politicians. Sharkey had fought for the World Heavyweight Championship and was arguably the greatest boxer the Navy produced at the turn of the century. Abe boxed or wrestled a kangaroo in an exhibition in Australia during his first world cruise with the Navy around 1907-8, but was thrown out of the ring by a swing of the animal's tail. These incidents were described with humor and detail in Abe's book as well as much later being the subject of noted sportswriter Harold Rosenthal's December 1978 article on Abe in Sports Illustrated. They added a certain color to the story of his life which appealed to the newspaper reporters that wrote about him in brief biographies.

Much of his early boxing experience took place in and around New York City, as his family kept a residence there until at least 1909, while Abe's father maintained an apartment on 167 East Broadway. As a young New York club fighter in 1906, Abe fought the better-known boxers Todo Moran, Patsy Connors, Harry Greenhouse and "Buffalo" Eddie Kelly. In the early Spring of 1906 in a smokey New York City boxing club known as the Lion's Palace, talented featherweight "Buffalo" Eddie Kelly took only ten seconds to knock an inexperienced eighteen-year-old Abe to the canvas for a full count. Two years later, Kelly would challenge the legendary Jewish boxer Abe Attell three times for the Featherweight Championship of the World.

=== Bout with Maurice Lemoine, December 1908 ===
On December 14, 1908, not long after his participation in the Cruise of the Great White Fleet at only twenty, Hollandersky fought a close six-round match with Maurice Lemoine at the Grand Opera House in New Haven, Connecticut. Though New London's The Day gave the decision to Lemoine, the prestigious New York Times felt Hollandersky had the better of the bout,"winning on points", and "battering Lemoine in the sixth and last round". The widely covered fight was a preliminary to a World Welterweight Title match between reigning Jewish World Welterweight Champion Harry Lewis, and his frequent opponent Willie Lewis.

In September 1910, two years after his close bout with Lemoine, Abe, with excessive self-confidence, challenged former World Welterweight Champion Honey Mellody to a bout by posting a challenge in The New London Day. Mellody's handler's declined to respond. Two weeks prior to the challenge, Mellody had knocked out Abe's December 1908 opponent Lemoine, and drew against him four months later in a bout in Webster, Massachusetts. Hollandersky used Mellody's matching with Lemoine, a boxer he may have beaten, as an indication he had the skills to face the ex-World Welterweight Champion.

=== New England opponents ===
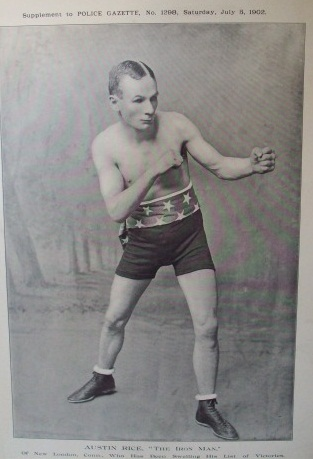
Austin Rice in his prime in 1902

Hollandersky's best known opponents in New England included Austin Rice, Dave Palitz, Al Rogers, Italian Joe Gans, and Tommy Teague. Teague was a Navy Welterweight Champion from the USS Michigan when they fought in June 1911, and later an unsuccessful opponent of New York Jewish boxer Al McCoy four days before McCoy, at only seventeen, became the youngest boxer to ever win the World Middleweight Championship. Both McCoy and Hollandersky would later appear in 20th Century Picture's 1933 The Bowery. Fellow welterweight boxer Al Rogers had decisively beaten ex-World Welterweight Champion Honey Mellody on June 10, 1912, in Baltimore just two weeks before beating Abe in an important fifteen round bout in the same city's Empire Theatre.

Hollandersky fought fellow New Londoner Austin Rice and Connecticut welterweight Dave Palitz on more than five occasions each. Rice had shown enormous boxing promise at age thirty as a contender for the Featherweight Championship of the World against Young Corbett II on January 14, 1903. Hollandersky fought Rice, who was twelve years older and sidelined as a carpenter, in both paid and exhibition bouts until the end of Rice's boxing career. Fellow New Londoner Mosey King, an early New England Lightweight Champion and Yale boxing coach for forty years, is included in Hollandersky's list of fights in the back of his autobiography as a "Win". King, who like Abe was of Jewish ancestry and raised in a close family, was Connecticut's first boxing commissioner from 1921 to 1923, and reputed to have given tips to any boxer looking to improve his game. He was a likely opponent of Hollandersky at least in a sparring or exhibition match, as he grew up in New London with Abe. According to at least one source, Rice, King, and Hollandersky shared Jimmy Nelson as an early coach and sparring partner as youths in New London. The legend goes that Nelson had worked as a corner man for undefeated World Lightweight Champion Jack McAuliffe before coming to New London.

=== Work with the Navy ===
Raising War bonds with Abe in center wearing tie, actor Jimmy Durante on left with fedora

Hollandersky's long career with the Navy included work as an independent supply boat operator or "bum boater" from which he sold magazines and newspapers to the fleet. His boat was a small motorized dingy that was rumored to have been given to him by Admiral Robley Evans. Early in his career, Abe saved several people from drowning and rescued stranded boats in Gardiner Bay off the docks of New London while "bum boating" for the Navy. "Bum boating" consisted of taking a small launch out to naval vessels and selling newspapers, magazines, and small supplies to Navy personnel. In his small launch, he also performed tasks such as delivering mail to naval ships. In his mid-career with the Navy, he worked as a boxing instructor for sailors at the pier in New London near the end of WWI, and as a recruiter of 1,700 naval personnel in WWII while he was living in Los Angeles. He also gave boxing exhibitions and training, and sold newspapers to Naval ships during his world cruises. After cruising to California in 1925, Abe helped the Navy provide relief for the aftermath of the Santa Barbara earthquake that struck on June 29, 1925. He raised War Bonds in WWII, occasionally capitalizing on his contacts with former boxers, and entertainers, such as Jimmy Durante, with whom he had worked in a movie. He later assisted the Navy in providing relief following the March 10, 1933 Los Angeles area earthquake that had an epicenter near Long Beach, California, where he had his news stand. He was caught in the earthquake on the day it struck, and narrowly escaped injury. By 1947, the Navy bestowed on Abe the "Award of Merit" for his recruiting of both men and women for WWII.

== Four cruises with the fleet ==
Hollandersky took four long voyages that included cruises on Naval vessels prior to his marriage. Abe took a cruise sometime between 1906 and 1908 that followed part of the Cruise of the Great White Fleet to Australia, and possibly Japan and China, and a second long boxing cruise beginning in 1912 from New London to Jamaica, Panama, Ecuador, Peru and Chile that returned to New London. His third trip was a voyage that included primarily land travel from New London, Connecticut to San Pedro, California in 1921, and his fourth cruise around 1924 went via sea from New London to Cuba than overland to the West Coast, before following the Trans-Pacific "Good Will Cruise" from San Francisco to Honolulu in June 1925.

During his cruises, Abe often boxed and wrestled matches for both the training and entertainment of the troops and fought a few land-based professional bouts as well. His primary function was acting as a newsboy to the crew, making stops to pick up English newspapers at most major ports.

== Cruise with Great White Fleet, 1907–1908 ==
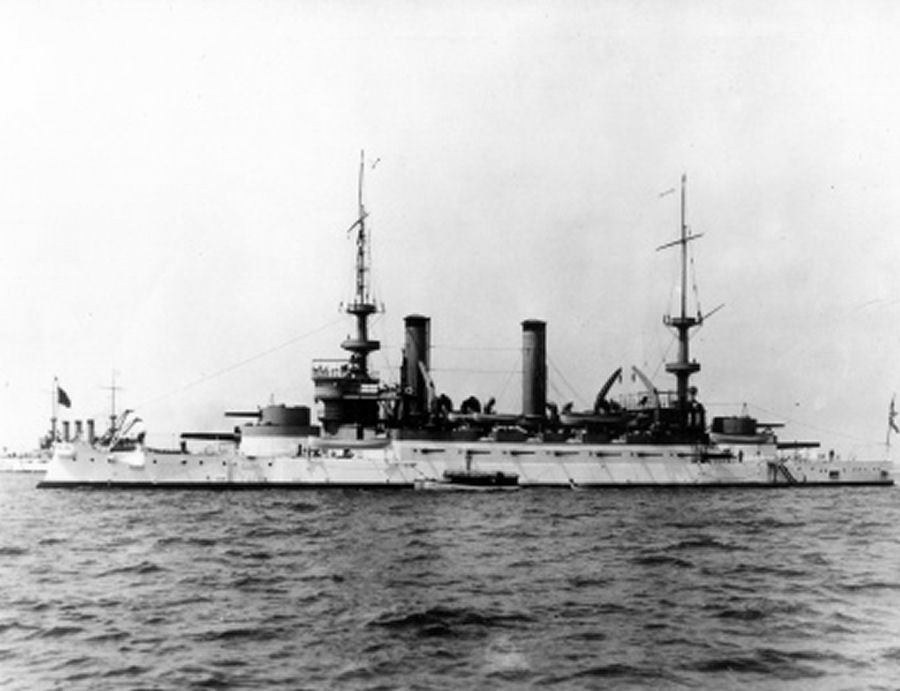
USS Kearsarge, with white hull on Cruise of Great White Fleet, 1908

Hollandersky's voyage to Australia occurred not long after he met Theodore Roosevelt, early in his boxing career, around 1906–08 as part of the Cruise of the Great White Fleet. The second half of the fourteen-month cruise, much of which included Abe, routed sixteen state-of-the-art coal burning American battleships with white painted hulls from the California coast to New Zealand, Australia, the Philippines, Japan, and China.

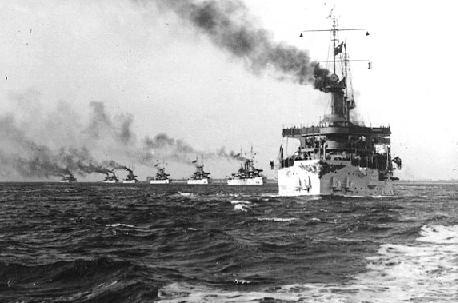
USS Connecticut leading the Great White Fleet, 1907

Japan was already threatening as a naval power and President Roosevelt, architect of the cruise, intended to demonstrate the strength of the American fleet to both allied countries and potential enemies. Hollandersky sailed aboard the USS Kearsarge and served as her newsboy as she circumnavigated the globe and docked at the Navy's most exotic ports. The pinnacle of naval technology at the time, the Kearsarge served as the flagship of the North Atlantic fleet through 1905. Both heavily armed and armored, she carried a crew of 550, and could cruise at a top speed of twenty miles per hour. She docked in Australia in August 1908, along with close to a thousand sailors from the fifteen other Naval vessels who flooded the streets and received a warm reception in Melbourne and Sydney. Abe would have had time to take primarily the Australian leg of the cruise. He likely stopped at Auckland, New Zealand, and possibly the Philippines as he was absent from New London through much of 1906, six months in 1907 and nine months in 1908 which included the period when the Kearsarge arrived in Melbourne in August. His rigorous boxing and wrestling schedule precluded him from traveling continuously for the full fourteen months of the cruise.

Chief Harry Simmon Morris, who served as an Ordinary Seaman and bugler on the USS Kearsarge during the cruise with Abe, became one of Abe's lifelong friends. A Torpedo's Mate for most of his career, Morris would become the longest-serving enlisted man in U. S. Naval history at 55 years, serving from 1903 to 1958.

After returning to New London from his travels around October 1908, Abe decided to meet a portion of the fleet on their return to America. He may have broken his record for newspaper sales when he and a group of newsies contracted to him sold thousands of papers to the returning sailors, off Hampton Roads, near Norfolk, Virginia. The Hampton Roads ceremony for the returning fleet included a speech by President Theodore Roosevelt aboard the USS Connecticut, flagship of the cruise, during the third week of February, 1909. According to his book, Hollandersky personally sold a paper to both the President and Admiral Evans on their return from the cruise.

== Second cruise, Central and South America 1912–14 ==
Hollandersky had a busy boxing schedule throughout 1910 and 1911. He used his naval privileges in combination with commercial vessels between 1912 and 1914, to sail south from his hometown of New London, selling newspapers to the fleet while stopping to fight boxing matches in Cuba, Jamaica, Panama, Chile, and later Mexico. He arrived in New York from Chile, ending his South American travels in early December 1914, before returning to New London. In January and February 1912, taking a commercial vessel South, he fought several bouts and wrestled at or near the base in Guantanamo, Cuba, while the fleet was on maneuvers. He served briefly as newsboy for the USS Delaware while she was in Cuba in January. The New York Tribune of March, 1912, reported "Abe has been with the fleet at Guantanamo all winter and has won several bouts with ease against the best the island affords." The Reverend W. H. "Ironsides" Reaney was a boxing mentor to Abe while he was in Cuba, and helped arrange his Cuban bouts during morning breakfasts aboard the ill-fated battleship USS Utah. Reaney helped referee a few shipboard fights, and had boxed in his earlier days. The USS Utah had been constructed the previous August, 1911, and was on a shakedown cruise ending in Guantanamo. Though obsolete by 1941, she would become one of the first ships lost at Pearl Harbor.

Abe credited Reaney with helping him to find matches in Jamaica and for encouraging him to seek his fortune in Panama City. In the early spring of 1912, Abe returned to the states via steamship from Cuba, resumed his boxing and wrestling career, and rescued a woman from a subway mishap in New London that August.

Heading South the following spring of 1913, Abe defeated talented black boxers T. K. Wint, billed as Young Jack Johnson, "Welterweight Champion of the West Indies," and Young Joe Jeanette in ten round bouts in Kingston, Jamaica. He then headed directly to Panama to face the Panamanian heavyweight champion Jack Ortega.

=== Panamanian Heavy Title, 1913 ===
Jack Ortega, circa 1900

His historic first bout for the Panamanian Heavyweight Title with Californian Jack Ortega in Panama City on May 30, 1913, featured an audience of nearly two thousand and included most of the members of an American congressional party in Panama, there to view the final stages of the building of the Panama Canal. According to Abe, the congressmen had sailed there on the presidential yacht Mayflower. Ortega, the reigning Panamanian heavyweight champion, was known to deliver knockout punches and his size made him a formidable opponent. Abe entered the ring to an ovation and a hearty round of applause, as Ortega was not a friend of the Panamanian crowd who knew him from previous fights. The match ended in an eighth round foul when, by most accounts, Abe was having the better of the bout, landing more frequent and strategic blows, if less powerful than his opponent's. Hollandersky was around twenty-five and in the prime of his boxing career, while Ortega was around thirty-six, and outweighed Hollandersky by at least thirty-five or forty pounds. He had power, and strength, but lacked the speed of his younger opponent.

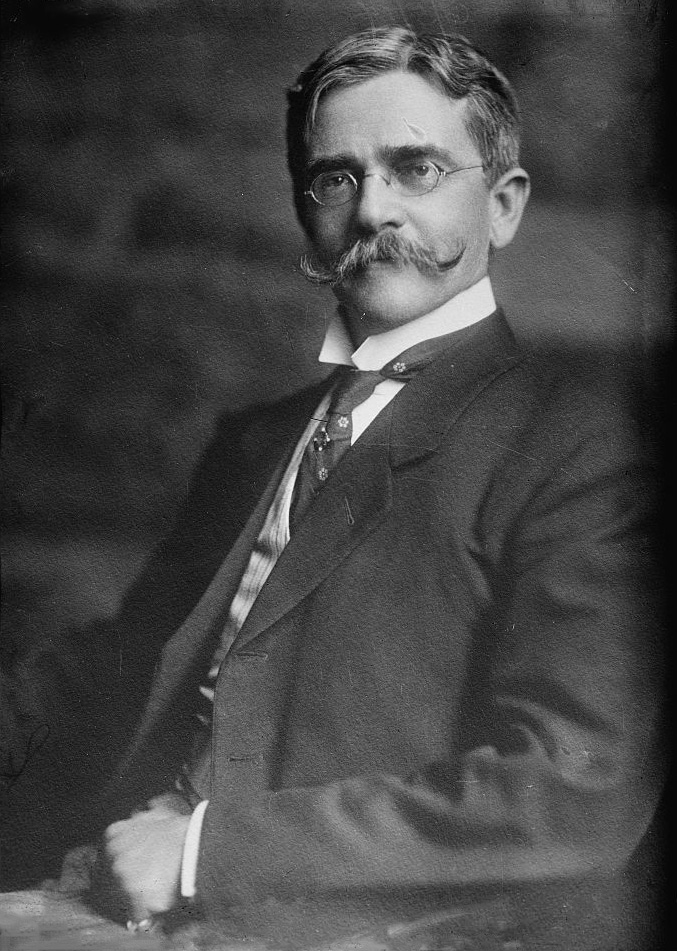
President Barahona, 1912

According to one newspaper, after Ortega pushed him onto the ropes in the final round, "Abe was partly in the ring and partly out of it, spectators in the crowd trying to prevent his falling from the platform and Ortega, without really realizing what he was doing but fighting madly, swung low and landed on Abe's groin". The article continues, "Abe, who did not fall when the blow was delivered, walked to his corner across the ring and then laid down on the floor to recover from the effects of the punch. The injury he received was apparent to all who were close to him when he was undressed by his seconds. It was some fifteen minutes before he was able to leave the ring." Hollandersky inferred in his autobiography the foul was probably intentional, particularly the one that ended his rematch with Ortega later in August. The foul ended the bout, and made Hollandersky Heavyweight Champion of Panama.

Taking home the princely sum of $900 for the bout, Hollandersky claimed to have used $600 of his winnings for a down payment on a home for his blind father Charles in New London, likely at 251 Huntington Street.

That night, Hollandersky was promised a Heavyweight Championship belt at a banquet in his honor in Panama City, and was invited to meet with the President of Panama, Belisario Porras Barahona. Abe spoke to the group of dignitaries, gamblers, and fellow boxers about his victory.

==== Panamanian heavyweight rematch, August 1913 ====
Ortega as young boxer

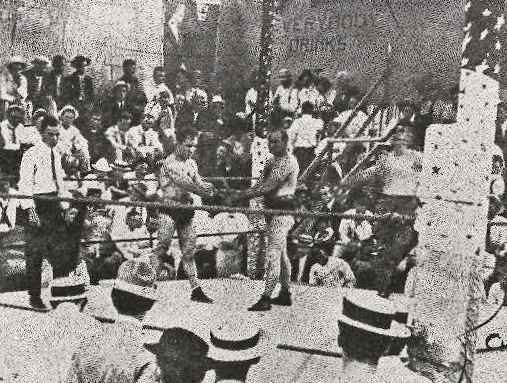
Rematch with Ortega on center right, August 11, 1913

Hollandersky successfully defended his Panamanian Heavyweight Title only once, in an 18 of 45 round rematch with Jack Ortega on Sunday, August 10, 1913, in the National Sports Arena in Panama City. After a morning rain, the lengthy match took place outdoors beneath the tropical sun, beginning around four in the afternoon. Hollandersky had trained for a full month, making a training camp on the neighboring Pacific island of Taboga, while Ortega had trained more diligently than he had for his first bout.

The initial rounds of the match went slowly and uneventfully, followed by several rounds where Ortega clinched frequently using his weight advantage to wear down his opponent. In the later rounds, Hollandersky landed frequent blows to the chest, probably lacking the reach to connect often with the head or chin and wary of exposing himself to an opponent with greater reach and power. Hollandersky did on occasion connect with a stiff left jab to the head of Ortega. Throughout the match, Ortega used backhanded blows from his glove to Hollandersky's face and jaw. With Ortega in pain, exhausted, struggling, and suffering from a blow to the chin, he struck Abe below the belt in round 18. According to Hollandersky's autobiography, Ortega, "backed away, leered at me, and then deliberately raised his leg and kicked me in the belly". One account indicates the blow was from a raised knee. After calling a foul for the low blow, the referee ended the bout, and Hollandersky retained the Panamanian Heavyweight Title.

Ortega would be arrested in Panama City only one week later for fixing a fight by taking a first round dive against the Pittsburgh boxer Buck Crouse. Hollandersky claimed in his book to have been present at the fight. In November 1900, Ortega had been convicted of assaulting an eleven-year-old girl in San Jose, California and was sentenced to life in San Quentin. He served only around twelve years before traveling to Panama. Prior to his arrest in 1900, he had once brutally kicked an opponent in the ring during a prize-fight in 1899, and in a separate incident been arrested for battery. Hollandersky claimed in his autobiography that Ortega had sent envoys to try to bribe him to lose their second bout, and that he had once attempted armed assault against him in a Panamanian bar.

=== Panamanian Title loss, 1914 ===
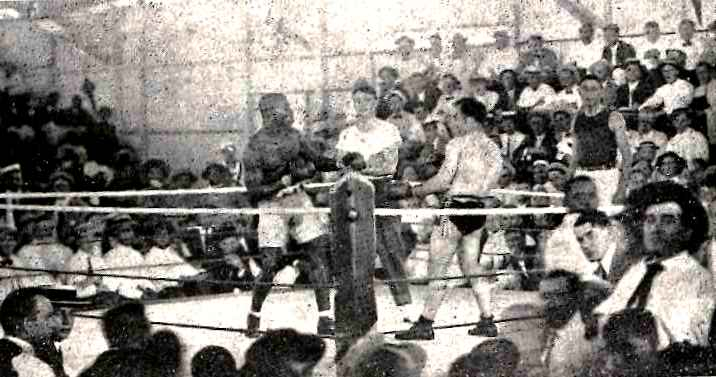
Loss of Panamanian heavyweight title to Norfolk, January 18, 1914

Five months after taking the championship from Ortega, Hollandersky lost his Panamanian heavyweight title, but lasted for twenty-five grueling rounds against the young and gifted, 1921 American "Colored" World Light Heavyweight Champion, William Ward, known as Kid Norfolk. Few in the crowd believed that Hollandersky would last ten rounds with the future Boxing Hall of Fame champion, who had a four-inch height advantage and outweighed him by over twenty-five pounds. Abe's ability to go the limit with Norfolk, seemed more impressive when considering, "from eleven until two o'clock on the day of the battle, Hollandersky was at Colon Harbor selling newspapers to the Marines on the USS Minnesota, only two hours before stepping into the ring with Kid Norfolk at four that afternoon".

The match took place at a Skating Rink in Ancon, Panama, on Sunday afternoon, January 18, 1914, before a sold-out crowd. New London's The Day wrote that Hollandersky had the edge in only three of the rounds, before the end when Norfolk "began battering Abe around the ring and trying hard for a knockout". The Panamanian crowd voiced their approval of the Newsboy's tenacity, and as soon as the final bell sounded to end the long contest, they "stormed the ring and carried the little fellow (Abe) off on their shoulders." Hollandersky claimed he was paid ten dollars a round for the Norfolk bout, and an additional seventeen hundred dollars that he shared from the winnings of his sailor friends, many of whom had bet on him to last ten rounds. This brought the total earnings for his evening's work to $1,950, roughly two years salary for many Americans in that era.

=== Boxing in Panama after title ===
The better known opponents Hollandersky fought in Panama after his loss of the title in 1914 included Jerry Cole, "Steamboat" Bill Scott, Tommy Connors, Eddie Ryan and later in 1916, Panama Joe Gans. Panama Joe had such legendary speed and skill that he would act as a sparring partner to prepare Jack Dempsey for his September 1920 Heavyweight Title bout with Hall of Famer Billy Miske as well as Dempsey's earlier bout when he first took the Heavyweight Championship from Jess Willard in Toledo.

The 5' 4" welterweight Hollandersky lost to Panama Joe, the younger and stronger Panamanian Light and Middleweight champion, and the accomplished middleweight Connors of Scranton, Pennsylvania, who had a five-inch height advantage. But he gave a closer fight to the Seattle welterweight Ryan before an impressive crowd of 1500 at the Savannah Club in Ancon, Panama on February 23, 1914. The Panamanian fans voiced their disapproval of the referee's Draw ruling as Hollandersky appeared to have landed more blows. The Norwich Bulletin felt Hollandersky had the edge in the Ryan bout which they referred to as a "Welterweight Championship of the Isthmus." Perhaps as a result, Abe's fight records at the end of his autobiography and Nat Fleischer's 1944 Ring Record Book referred to Hollandersky as a Welterweight Champion of Panama, though his actual title was heavyweight champion.

== Boxing and wrestling, 1914–18 ==
After his loss to Jerry Cole in May 1914, Hollandersky sailed South from Panama to Ecuador and Peru, and spent the Fourth of July 1914, on a snow-covered peak in the Andes. In August and September 1914, he fought Chilean Valeriano Dinamarca and black middleweight William Daly several times near the coast in Valparaiso, Chile receiving a badly broken nose from a blow by Daly. Their brutal September bout, scheduled for six rounds, ended in a third-round disqualification when Abe accidentally head-butted Daly. On a substantial bet, heading inland to Santiago, Chile, Abe fought a jiu-jitsu wrestling match with a Count Sako, part of a Japanese wrestling troop. Abe claimed he had a cursory knowledge of certain martial arts including jiu-jitsu. He won the match, which included three sets, the first Jiu Jitsu, the second catch-as-catch-can or mixed and the third American style Greco-Roman. He lost only the first Jiu Jitsu set to his Japanese opponent who was clearly more skilled in the Japanese martial art. Abe then returned to the states by sea.

In February 1915, giving up five inches in reach, Abe lost a twenty-round bout to 5' 9" El Paso welterweight Frankie Fowser in Agua Prietta, Mexico, a border town near Douglas, Arizona. He made a brief appearance in El Paso then spent early March through early June 1915 in Fort Worth, Texas, arranging wrestling bouts, including two with Jimmy Pappas in April, winning one. He refereed a free boxing and wrestling exhibition on March 27, wrestled an exhibition with Joe Gens, a Russian Jewish immigrant, and shadow boxed at a benefit for the Jewish Community of Fort Worth's YMHA, that drew over three hundred guests.

=== Losses to Dave Palitz, 1915–16 ===
Perhaps the single fight that most influenced the "Newsboy" to retire was his brutal loss to welterweight Dave "KO" Palitz on September 6, 1915, in Lawrence Hall in New London. An accomplished welterweight, Palitz would unsuccessfully challenge Lou Holtz for the Connecticut State Welterweight Championship in 1920. During a boxing and wrestling tour in the Southwest and Mexico in the first half of 1915, Hollandersky had suffered from an illness of several weeks which may have contributed to his lack of conditioning for the bout. The Springfield Courier said of the twenty round battle that "K. O. Palitz of this city handed Abe the worst trimming a man ever received in a local ring, though the newsboy was on his feet at the end of the bout". New London's The Day, noticing Abe's puffy face, swollen ears, and blackened eye after the fight, wrote "he looked as if his demise were near at hand." The following February, Palitz defeated Abe again in a less brutal ten-round match which Hollandersky had staged and promoted. The day of boxing featured boxers Joe Azevedo, an exceptional lightweight, Young Terry, and Charley Curley. Though Hollandersky continued to find matches, and even returned to Panama for several lucrative bouts in 1916, he may have sensed his days as a competitive prize fighter fighting top talent were numbered.

=== Promoting Battling Levinsky ===
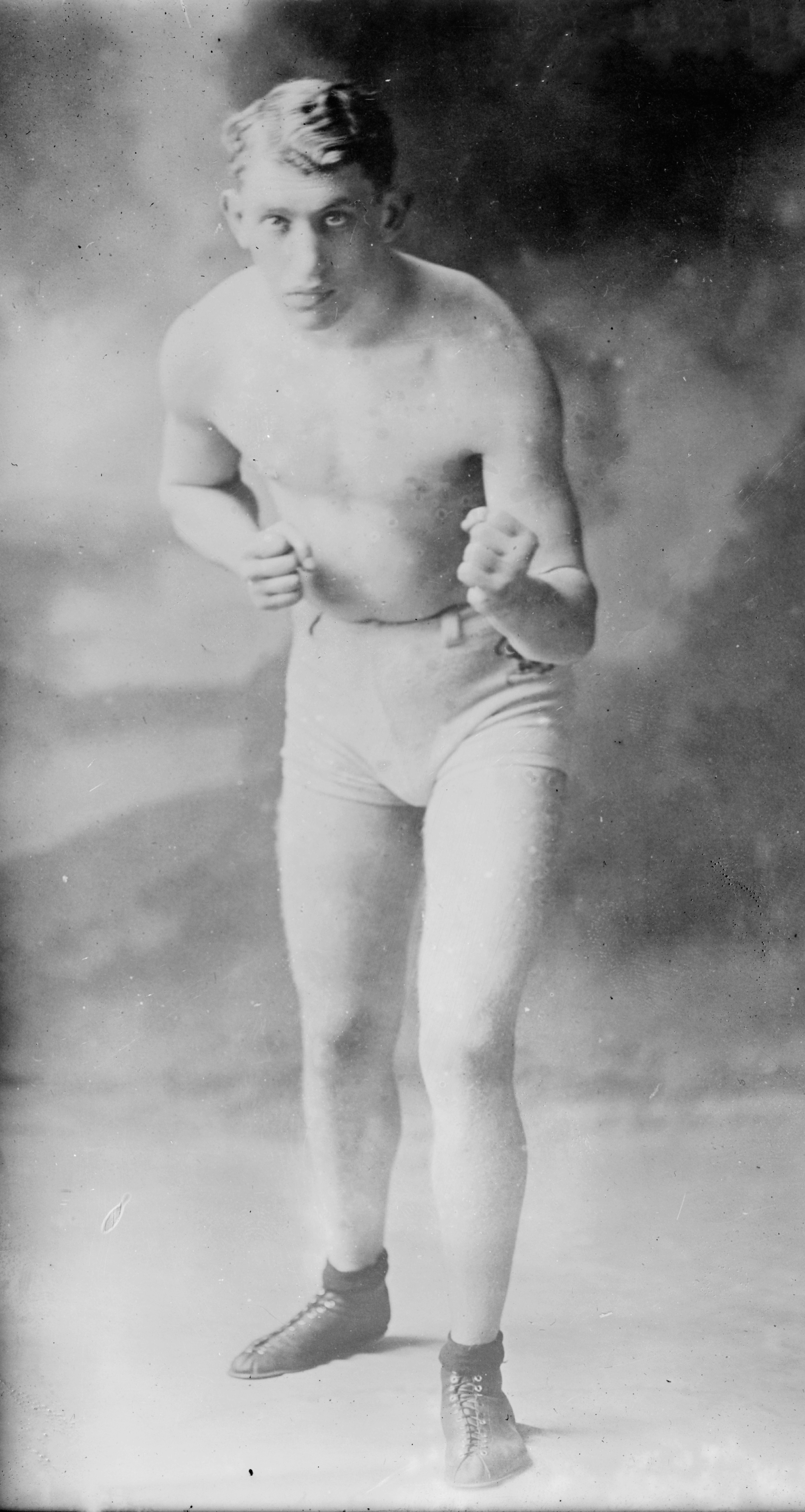
Battling Levinsky, 1916–20 world light heavyweight champion

On March 9, 1916, Hollandersky promoted a fight between Hall of Fame Philadelphian Jewish boxer Battling Levinsky, and Sailor Jack Carroll sponsored by the Greenwood Athletic Club, fought in Lawrence Hall in New London. Levinsky, who won the ten round bout, would take the World Light Heavyweight Championship only seven months later, and hold it for four years. Like Abe, the far more accomplished Levinsky, born Beryl Lebrowitz, was a prolific New York based Jewish boxer, who may have fought as many as five hundred bouts. During his career, Levinsky fought many of boxing's greatest including Jack Dempsey, Gene Tunney, Billy Miske, and French boxer George Carpentier.

=== Exhibitions with Abe Attell, 1916 ===
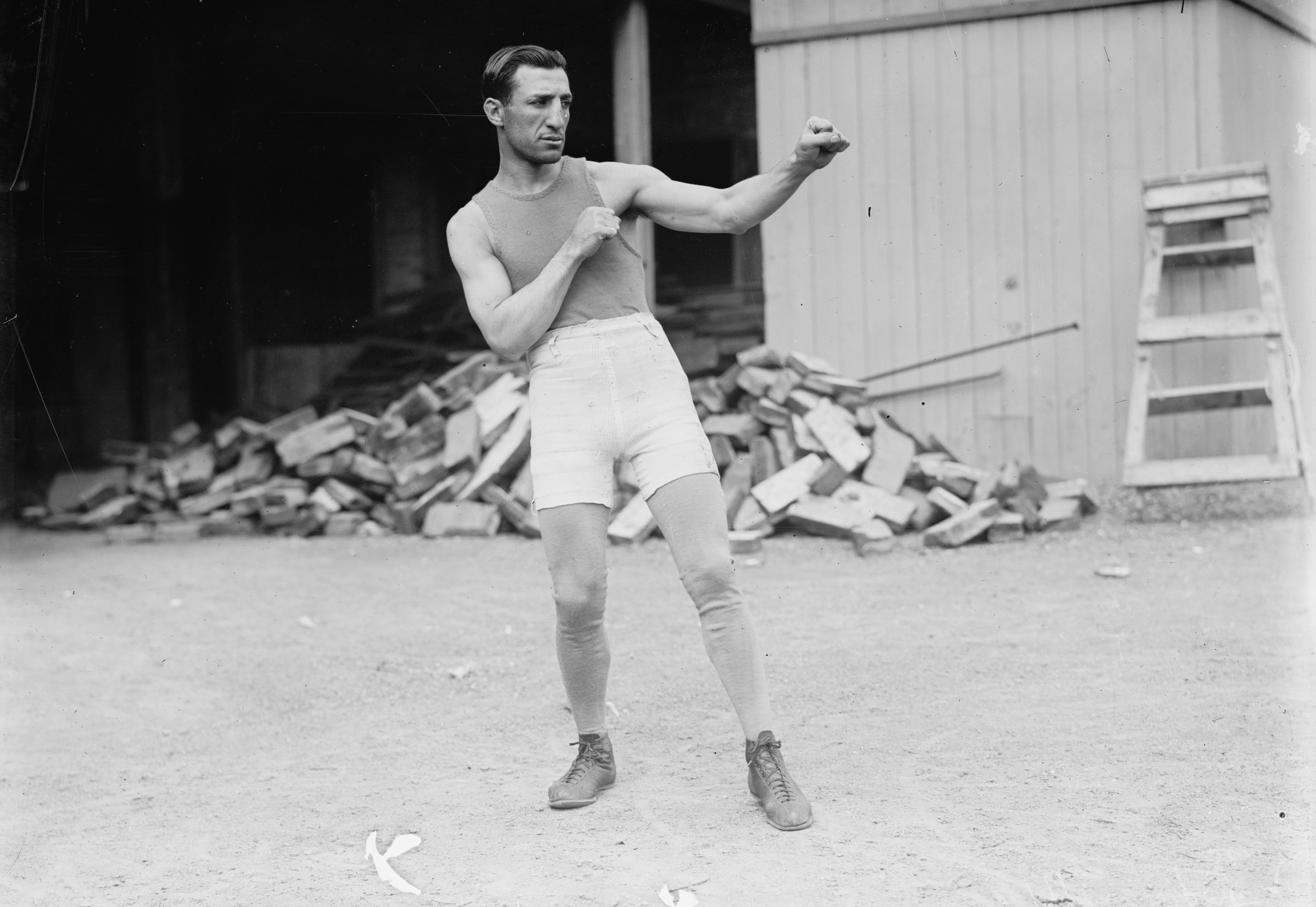
Abe Attell, Featherweight Champion

Later in New London in May 1916, Abe faced off against his best known exhibition opponent, Abe Attell, the brilliant but flawed former World Featherweight Champion, suspected of betting on several of his own fights and later accused of helping to fix the 1919 White Sox vs. Reds World Series with gangster Arnold Rothstein. Known as the Black Sox Scandal, the event brought to the forefront the corruption of American sports as it approached the roaring 20s. Abe met Attell in four three round exhibition matches at Empire Theatre while Attell was giving speaking performances in New London near the end of his boxing career.

Abe claimed to have fought what was likely a sparring match with Canadian Heavyweight champion Arthur Pelkey. Pelkey was a Panamanian national heavyweight title contender in February 1917 at Panama's Santa Anna Plaza against Kid Norfolk, during the same period Abe was fighting bouts at the Plaza with Panama Joe Gans and Willie Barnes.

=== Panamanian Welter championship ===
In his last prize fight in Panama City in June 1917, Hollandersky lost to Pat Kiley in an unsuccessful 15 round attempt at the Panamanian Welterweight Title. It would be his last recognized championship bout. Leaving Panama in July, he would stop in New York to help accompany his father Charles, who was ill, to New London.

Perhaps as a result of his loss to Kiley in his last championship bout, and his previous brutal loss to Dave Palitz in September 1915, Abe prematurely announced his retirement from boxing to his local paper on Christmas Eve 1917. He continued with exhibition matches, including those on ship and on bases to assist with the training of sailors, but subsequently faced very few opponents in actual prize fights. Returning to New London in August 1917 from Panama City after his loss to Kiley, Abe was not permitted to join the Navy for WWI due to his eyesight, but was fortunate enough to find a position as a Naval boxing instructor at a base near the New London Pier. Fighting training matches for the instruction of naval troops often daily, his personal tally of fights continued to climb rapidly.

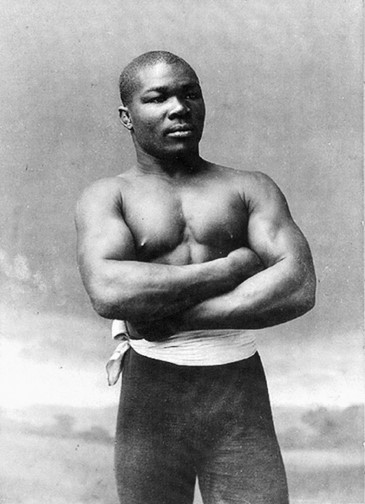
Welterweight champ Joe Walcott

=== Exhibition with champion Joe Walcott ===
Gene Tunney, Hollandersky, and Larry Williams

Facing another well known opponent in an exhibition match on November 16, 1918, Hollandersky met the former light and welterweight world champion Joe Walcott in New London for a four-round match to benefit the United War Workers of America. The bout showcased intense boxing strategy, though Walcott was well past his prime. Appearing as the headliner for the benefit was Larry Williams, a light heavyweight of considerable skill, who would act as a sparring partner for Jack Dempsey in 1921 and later for Dempsey's successor as world heavyweight champion, Gene Tunney. Williams would appear with Abe in MGM's The Crowd Roars (1938). A photograph of Hollandersky with Williams and Gene Tunney, likely taken at a boxing benefit or training match, appear in most editions of Abe's book.

== Third cruise 1919–22, to California ==
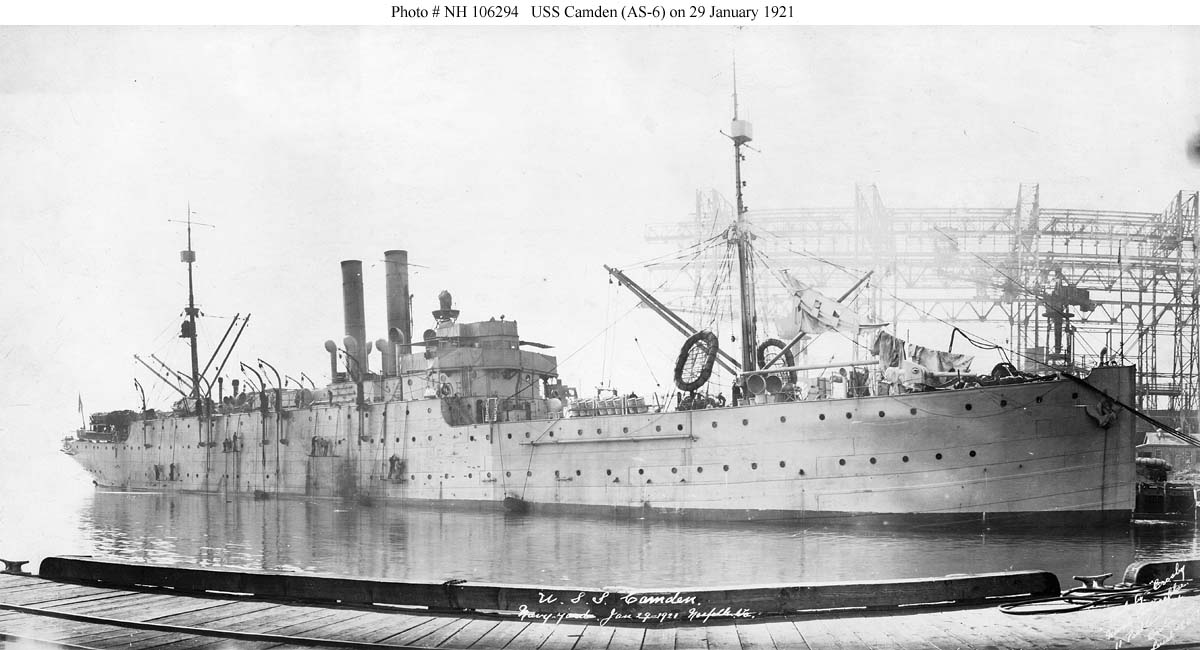
USS Camden, January 1921

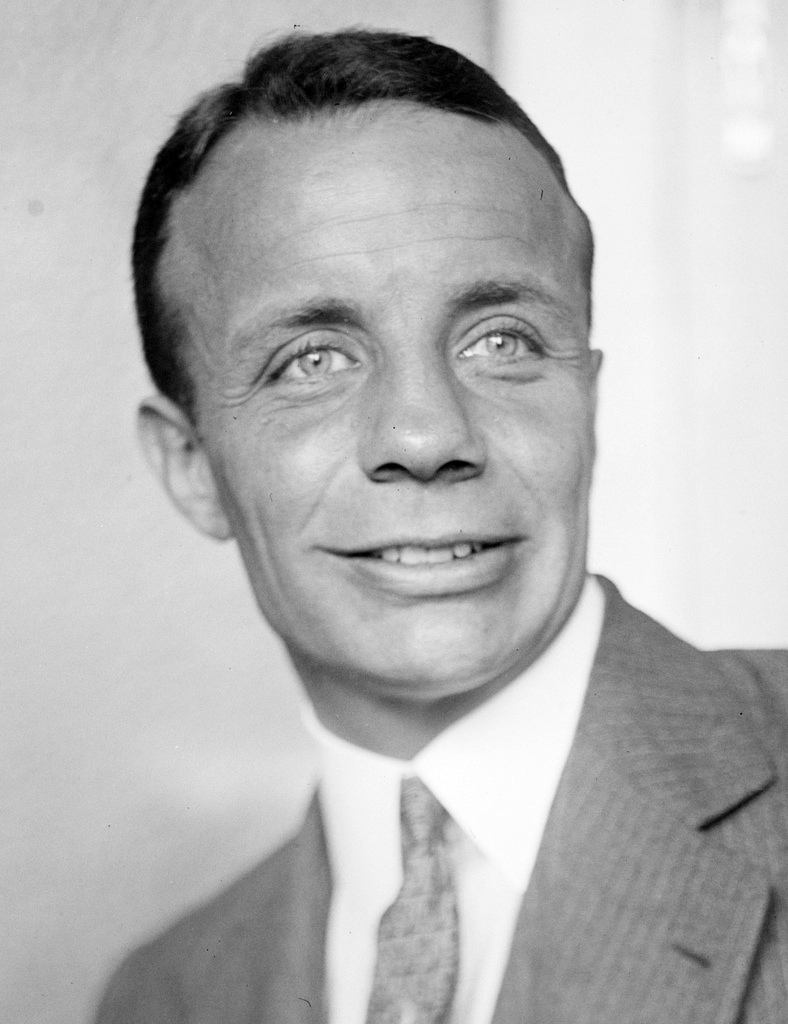
Theodore Roosevelt Jr.

Abe took his second cruise between 1920 and 1922. Though he definitely traveled from New London to the Naval base in San Pedro and returned to New London via a land route, little is known at this time of any additional Naval travels, as even in peacetime he was reluctant to record the movement of Navy ships in his biography. In San Pedro, he spent time delivering papers, giving boxing training, and performing odd jobs aboard the USS Camden (AS-6), a four hundred foot, highly armed, slow-moving submarine tender with a crew of around 300, confiscated from the German Navy in WWI. She sailed from her home port at New London's submarine base to San Pedro, where she arrived on June 24, 1921. The San Francisco Examiner noted that Abe took a world cruise during this period, but recorded no ports of call, though England, France, and western Europe seem likely stops as his book notes he went there, and previous cruises omitted these destinations. Prior to his cruise, he wrote to and met briefly with Theodore Roosevelt Jr., Assistant Secretary of the Navy, to gain rights of passage to the coast. In a letter of May 1921, the Secretary thanked Hollandersky for his visit and mentioned he was aware of Abe's plans to visit the West Coast. Hollandersky boxed sailor Billy Capelle in San Pedro, California, in February 1922.

Capelle, better known as Willie Cappelli or Cappelle, was an accomplished welterweight from San Pedro at the end of his boxing career. Lieutenant John "Jack" F. Kennedy, a gunnery officer on the USS Mississippi, was a good friend who acted as a referee for several of Abe's shipboard bouts and may have refereed his bout with Capelle. Both Abe and Kennedy had worked extensively with Navy boxing teams. Kennedy, whose photograph appeared with Abe in most of his books, testified for the defense at Jack Dempsey's 1920 draft evasion trial in California and was considered as the referee for the World Heavyweight Championship between Jack Dempsey, and Jess Willard in Toledo, Ohio.

After arriving in San Pedro from New London, Abe went to San Francisco in July 1922, stopped to look for wrestling bouts, and then headed overland to El Paso, Texas, to meet friends on August 18, before returning to Connecticut. At the intermission of a fight fought by his frequent opponent Dave Palitz in Mystic, Connecticut, on August 30, 1922, Abe announced to the audience he had just returned from a world cruise.

== "Good Will" cruise, to Hawaii, 1925 ==
As was often his habit before long cruises, Hollandersky first visited the White House. Before his cruise to Hawaii, he met President Calvin Coolidge and the White House staff in late October 1924. While there, Coolidge likely discussed ship movements and Abe's rights to sell papers to the Trans-Pacific fleet that would begin their voyage the following summer. Hoover also provided an autographed photo which appeared in all of Abe's books. In January 1925, he sailed from New England to Cuba to sell papers to the fleet and visit the Roosevelt Memorial in Santiago. He received a reference letter that February to assist him in his journey from Commander H. G. Gearing of the USS Dobbin, near Guantanamo, and then made his way to the West Coast overland by that spring making a stop in El Paso on his way to California. Much of his travel to San Francisco that Spring was by train.

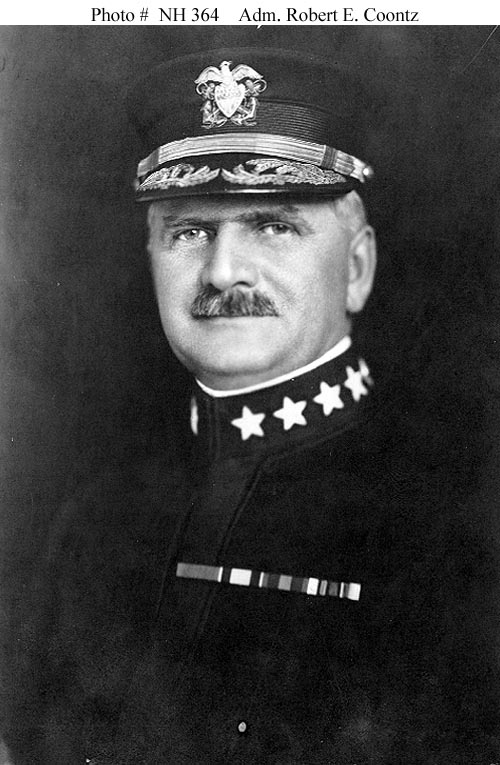
Admiral Robert E. Coontz, Commander of the 1925 Good Will Cruise

It was his plan that summer of 1925 to sell hundreds of papers to many of the 57 vessels of the combined Atlantic and Pacific fleets departing from ports in San Francisco, and San Pedro and heading for Hawaii, and Australia as part of a Trans-Pacific "Good Will" cruise. He departed San Francisco for Hawaii on April 15, 1925 aboard the commercial vessel Matsonia ahead of nearly all the fleet, but did not accompany the ships of the cruise to Australia as he had been there around 1908. The cruise was the largest assembly of American Naval vessels bound for a world tour since the cruise of the Great White Fleet seventeen years earlier. Abe received permission to sell papers to the ships of the 1925 Trans-Pacific Cruise from Admiral Robert Coontz, Commander of the cruise's flagship USS Washington. Hollandersky arrived in Honolulu, Hawaii, on April 21, 1925, six days after departing. That summer, he fought his last professional fight in Honolulu attended by territorial Governor Wallace Farrington and cruise commander Admiral Robert Coontz. The bout was most likely fought on June 5, 1925 at the Pearl Harbor Arena, as part of a series of matches attended by five thousand sailors and marines, many of whom were part of the Good Will Cruise. The primary boxing participants were a team from the Cruise's Scouting Fleet who boxed against a team from the Cruise's Battleship fleet. Farrington had worked as Editor for the Honolulu Star-Bulletin prior to becoming governor, and Abe was given several stories in the large local paper.

He left Honolulu on July 29, 1925, after a working vacation of three months, and returned to San Francisco via commercial liner in mid-August, attending the Diamond Jubilee, the 50th anniversary of California statehood. While in San Francisco, he met with Mayor James Rolph who assured him he could continue his work as a movie extra in Los Angeles should he move to the West Coast. Abe had had at least one brief movie role while living in New England. Rolph had appeared in a few movies himself. Heading north, he helped the Navy with the aftermath of the June 29, 1925 Santa Barbara earthquake. While in the Los Angeles area in late 1925, he posed for a photograph with heavyweight world champion Jack Dempsey and flyweight champion Fidel LaBarba who had several bouts scheduled there late that year. Wearing gloves and boxing shoes in the photo, Dempsey was likely on a break from a sparring session. Dempsey would meet and get to know Abe on several occasions, particularly after the publication of Abe's book. Besides appearing in Abe's books, several newspapers ran the photo under the caption, "Famous Boxing Champions Meet Again," though Hollandersky's celebrity could hardly compare to Dempsey's. Besides his Central and South American travels between 1912 and 1917, his cruises with the Navy took him to locations as afar as Japan, China, Cairo, Melbourne, Brussels, Paris, Rome and London.

== Hollandersky's tally of fights ==
Nat Fleischer's Ring Record Book for 1944 listed around 450 of Hollandersky's bouts, but these were drawn from a nearly identical listing in the back of Hollandersky's autobiography and are mostly unverified. They appear to contain frequent errors in the years the bouts took place and the number of rounds when compared with his BoxRec record.

The majority of his fights were exhibitions staged for entertainment and training on Navy ships and bases, and included non-navy exhibitions and a few sparring matches. Dispute will probably continue as to the exact number of boxing matches Hollandersky fought, as his BoxRec record lists only around 100. However, these by definition exclude all his Naval and land based exhibitions, as well as sparring and training matches which he often included in his personal tally.

== Benefits and exhibitions ==
A small sampling of around twenty of the matches he boxed for benefits and exhibitions include:

- George Dixon Memorial Fund at Bower's Minery Theatre, New York, January 23, 1908. Hollandersky, said he once sparred with Joe Gans, and the week of this event would have been an opportune time for them to briefly meet, as Gans was present at the memorial and gave a short speech.
- Austin Rice, former World Championship Featherweight contender, exhibition for "Nest of Owls order 1382", New London CT. January 17, 1911
- Young Sherman of Mystic, CT., exhibition at Elks Lodge, New London, May 24, 1911
- Paddy Fenton, aging former welterweight contender, New London County Fair, six rounds, circa September 1911
- Dave Palitz, 6 round exhibition, for Bartender's Local 356, Richards Grove, Groton, Connecticut, August 25, 1912
- Terry Mitchell, Sparring Rounds, Abe said he had boxed Mitchell in a letter to the Hartford Courant dated December 3, 1912, fight may have taken place circa November 8, or December 9, 1912, when Mitchell was in New London to fight Dave Palitz. Abe had a fight with Phil Harrison in Lawrence Hall in New London on the same night Mitchell fought Dave Palitz on December 9, 1912.
- USS Denver exhibition, off Panama City, boxed sailors Mussbel, Medino, Koch, and Jiran, April 5, 1914
- Bill Scott, 4 round exhibition at the Variedades Theatre in Panama City, May 10, 1914.
- Abe Attell, legendary ex-Featherweight Champ, four 3 round exhibitions, Empire Theatre, New London, May 2–3, 1916
- WWI War Veterans Benefit, 3 rounds with future Connecticut State Welterweight Championship contender Dave Palitz, Chicopee, MA, December 19, 1917
- Frank Ryan, 4 rounds with the Navy Welterweight, in New London, May 16, 1918, State Pier
- Joe Walcott, former world welterweight champion, 4 rounds to benefit the United War Workers Campaign, New London, CT., November 1918
- Sailor Billy Capelle of San Pedro, Lost 4–6 round professional bout, February 23, 1922, at Peck's Pavilion, Point Fermin Park, San Pedro, California
- Jimmy Woodruff, a naval chief petty officer, fought a benefit for the Navy Relief Society at the Royal Palms in San Pedro, on September 3, 1933
- Navy Flood Relief, fought sailor Mike Hector, who had boxed aboard the USS Tennessee, Long Beach Municipal Auditorium, February 3, 1937
- "Night of Memories" benefit for boxing promoter Wad Wadhams, Hollywood Legion Stadium, October 9, 1937, featuring boxers Henry Armstrong, Jack Silver, Jimmy McLarnin, Jackie Fields, and more.

== Autobiography, 1930 ==
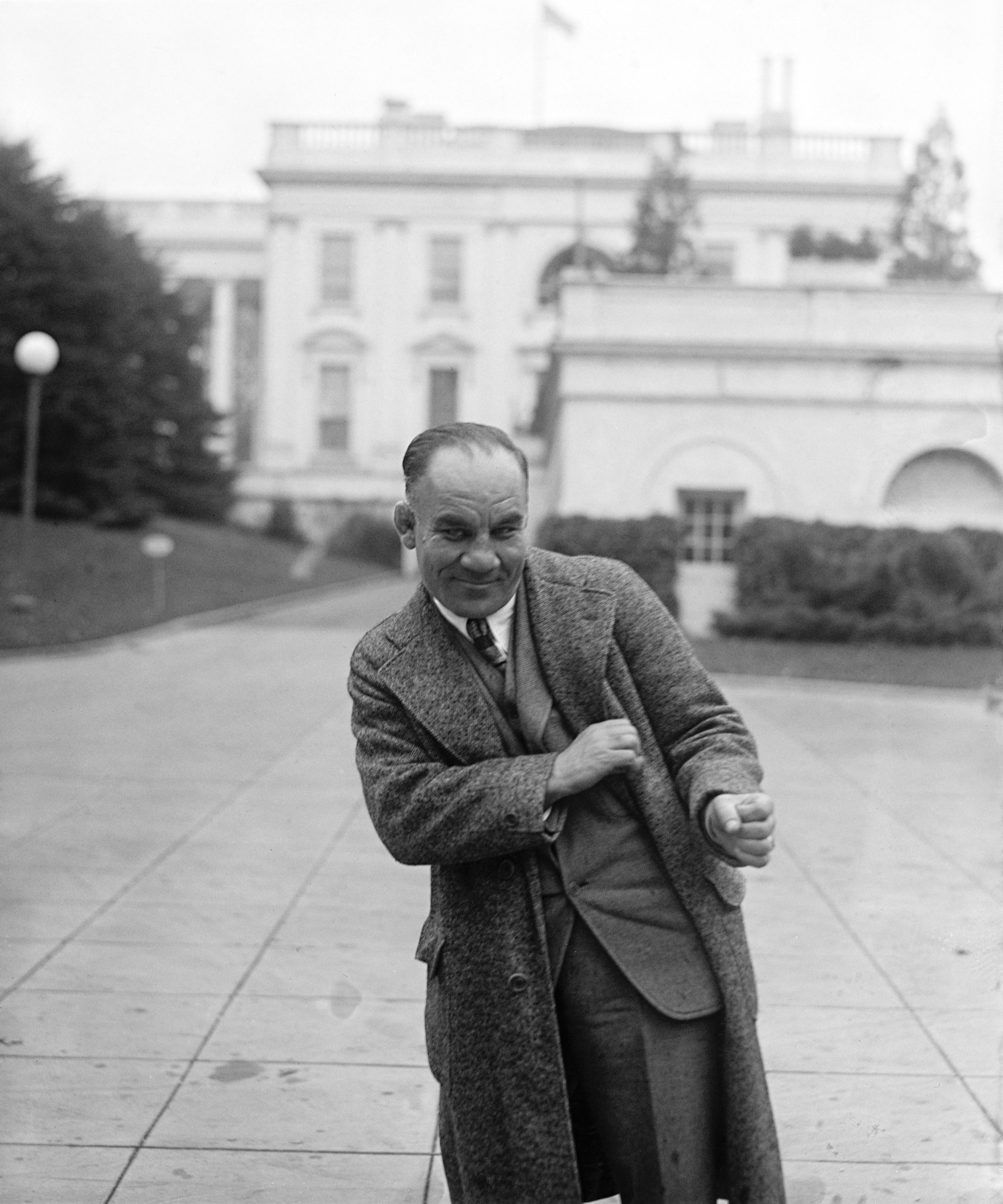
Hollandersky near White House Southern Facade, after he met with Hoover, 11/8/1929

During one of Abe's few White House visits on November 8, 1929, just a few weeks after the great stock market crash, Hollandersky met briefly with President Herbert Hoover who signed a photograph for Abe's autobiography. Hollandersky may have received rights of passage for travel from the presidential staff, campaigned for other signed photographs, and asked for book endorsements from Navy brass who advised the President. He soon would return to his home and newspaper shop in Los Angeles. Abe had traveled to the East Coast and New York to complete his biography, as it was first published only four months after his White House visit.

Former New York columnist, and inconoclastic author C. L. Edson gave serious assistance to writing Abe's autobiography. Both Abe and Edson were acquaintances of Jewish journalist Walter Winchell. Abe's book had had previous ghostwriters attempt to assist with the publication with less success. While in New York in 1929, Hollandersky dictated the great majority of the book to Edson, and large portions of the text appear to be copied verbatim from Hollandersky's dictation. Hollandersky used newspaper articles from his vast collection of clippings as research, and may have written small portions of the text, including his boxing record, himself. According to historian Abraham Hoffman, up to 20,000 copies of his autobiography may have been printed. These included nearly annual new editions which continued until 1960. The second edition in 1936, added the last three chapters of the book 23–25, the only notable changes to the original text of the 1930 edition. All editions subsequent to 1936 included only new photographs, largely of Navy ships and Naval acquaintances. The book's content is reliable in most respects, but occasionally Hollandersky's sequencing of events is off.

=== Interview with Damon Runyon, March 1930 ===
On March 24, 1930, playwright, journalist, and one of America's greatest sportswriter's on boxing, Damon Runyon, interviewed Hollandersky about his newly published book for his New York American Sports column "Between You and Me." During his interview, Runyan discussed Abe's independently financed book, and noted his frugality in completing and publishing it prior to marrying.

Hollandersky decided to fund the publishing of his autobiography himself, though he had been offered a thousand dollars in 1925 to finance it by his friend Bull Montana. Montana, a former wrestler and Hollywood actor, was a close friend of boxer Jack Dempsey and movie actor and Jewish director Douglas Fairbanks Jr., both of whom Abe claimed to have made movies with. Montana not only appeared in movies with Dempsey but wrestled him in front of the press on several occasions, most notably at a well attended work out in Atlantic City, New Jersey, in June 1921.

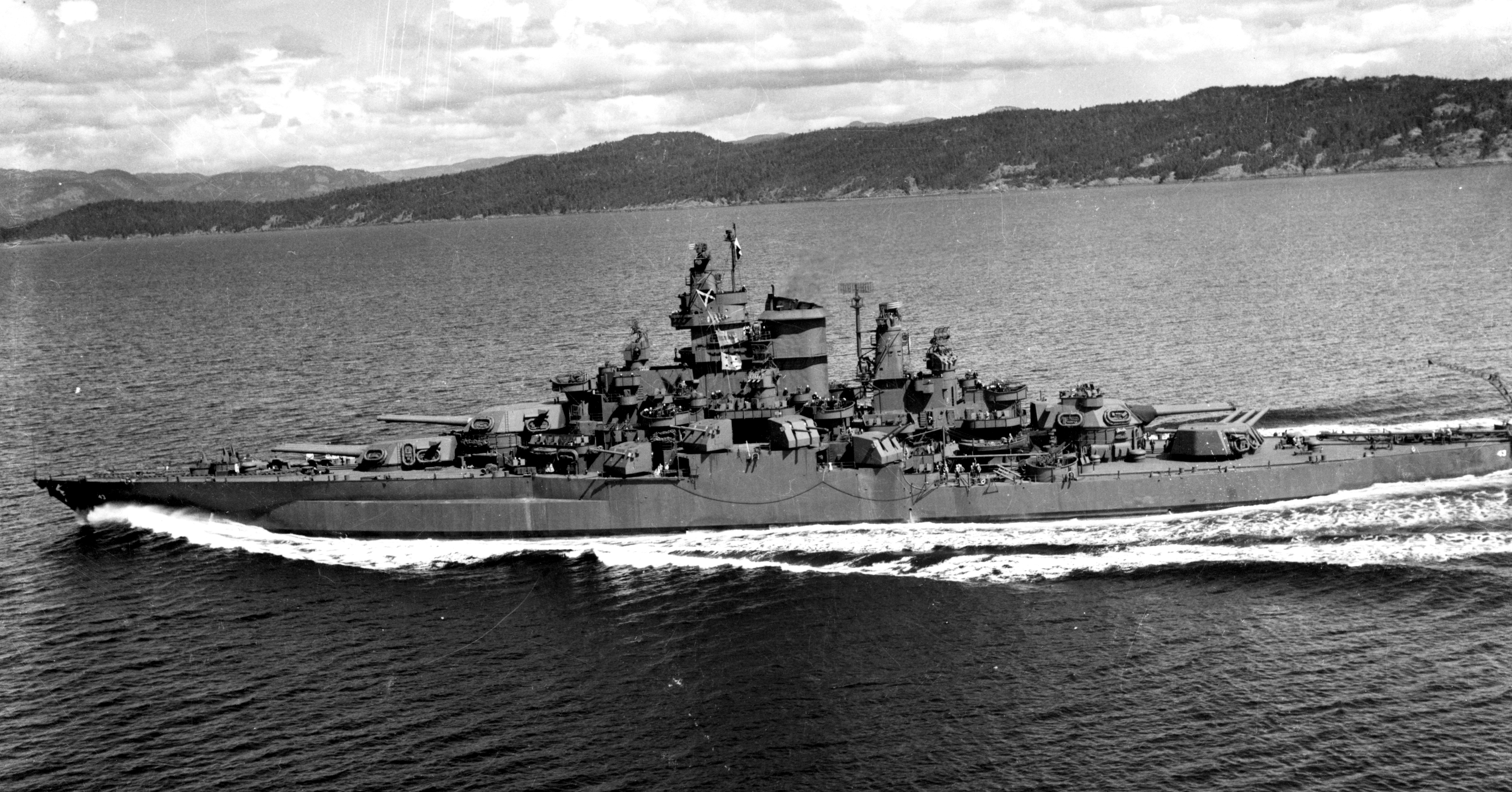
USS Tennessee

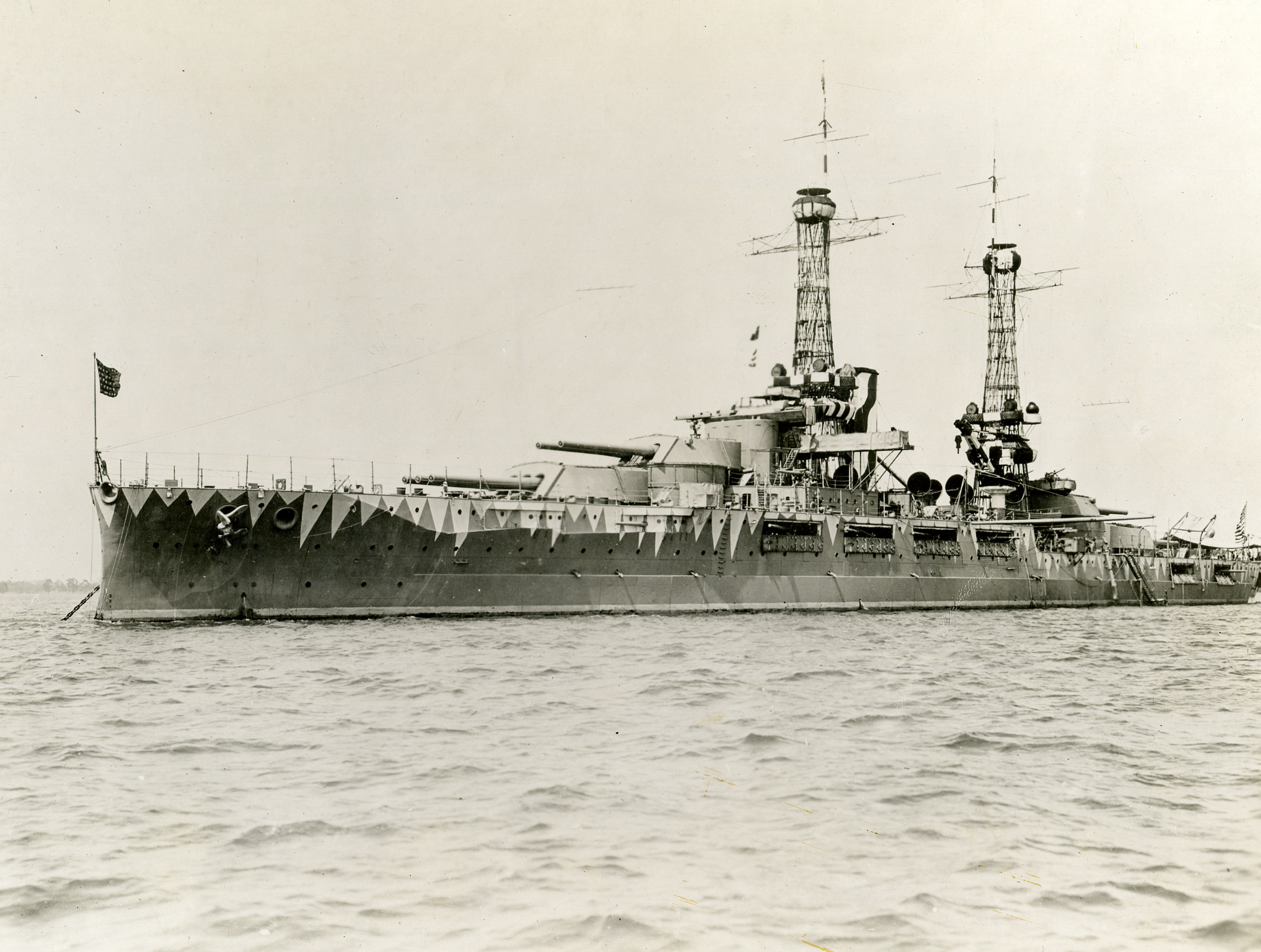
Battleship USS Oklahoma had noted boxing teams

Hollandersky often took orders for his autobiography before new editions, particularly the first two, from Navy personnel of the Pacific fleet in San Pedro harbor, and for later editions in San Diego after he moved there around 1946. Three of the many ships from whose crew he took book orders were the USS Arizona, USS West Virginia, and USS Oklahoma. The Arizona and Oklahoma both had noteworthy boxing and wrestling instruction during the years Abe boarded them, and sadly both were badly damaged at Pearl Harbor, with the Arizona becoming a permanent monument after it sank. Abe may have helped with boxing instruction and taken orders for books on the USS Tennessee and USS Nevada, as he had signed photos of several boxers from both ships in his book, and the USS New Mexico, as he posed for a photo with one of their athletic teams. Two other large battleships that Abe boarded with a Liberty Pass and known for their boxing were the USS Texas, and the USS California which was also damaged at Pearl Harbor. He continued to personally sell his book directly to the public during his retirement.

== Marriage in 1931 ==
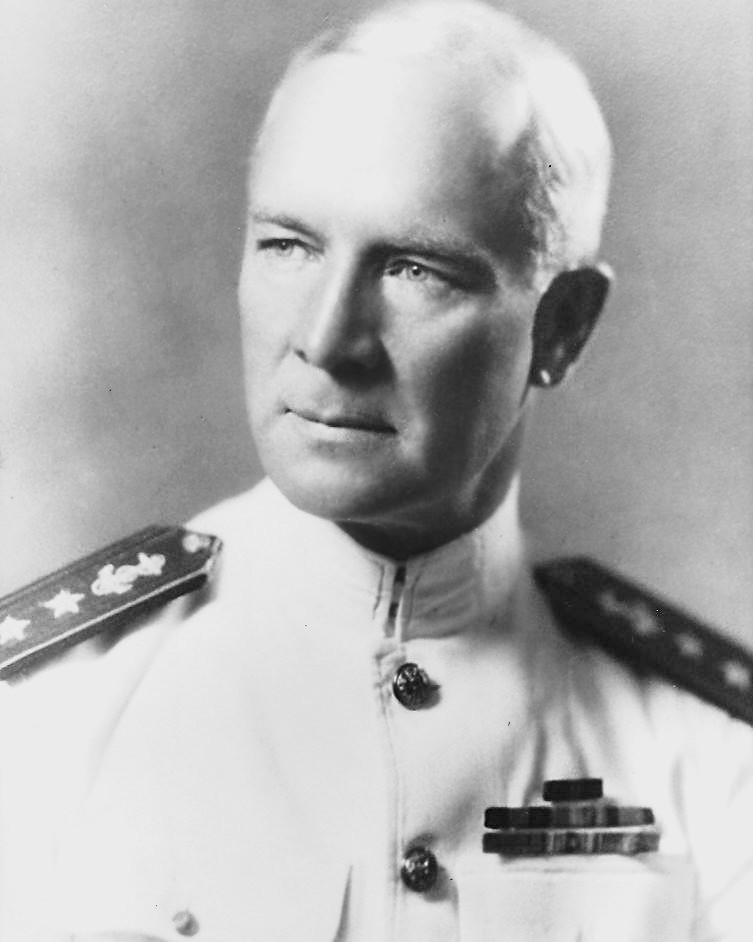
Admiral Wat Tyler Cluverius

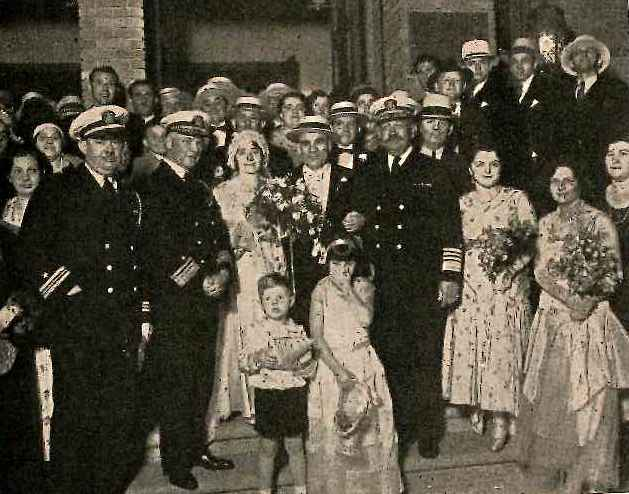
Wedding couple in center, flanked by Admirals W. T. Cluverius on left of Freda, and JV Chase on right of Abe in tuxedo

Hollandersky married Freda Weinberg on June 7, 1931, in Los Angeles, where he had moved permanently in 1928 from New London. He announced his engagement to Freda in a reception on Bellevue Road in Los Angeles on June 2, 1928 at a large party with over 100 friends in attendance. According to her naturalization papers, Freda, also of Jewish origin, was born in Glasgow, Scotland and had emigrated to the United States from Halifax, Nova Scotia. Not long after they first met, Abe took a cruise to Hawaii in April 1925. Abe began to consider marriage with Freda after meeting her at the small shop she was working at in Los Angeles. They courted for three years before marrying.

Abe claimed several thousand attended his wedding reception at the Jewish Sheltering Home in Los Angeles, including a number of high-ranking naval officers, most notably Admiral Wat Tyler Cluverius Jr., base commander of the Pacific Fleet. At the time, Cluverius was acting as Chief of Staff for Rear Admiral Jehu V. Chase, the Commander in Chief United States Fleet, who also attended the wedding. Pictures of both men at Hollandersky's wedding reception are featured in his autobiography. Cluverius, as a young Lieutenant, was one of the few survivors of the sinking of the Maine, the incident which led to the Spanish–American War. On February 3, 1937, Abe attended a Navy benefit for flood relief organized under the command of Cluverius, at the Long Beach Municipal Auditorium, where he sparred with navy fighter Mike Hector in a brief exhibition. Hector, who had boxed on the USS Tennessee, had been a 1930 Navy boxing champion and an acquaintance of Abe since at least March 1936. Hollandersky stayed in touch with Cluverius after his retirement from the Navy and visited him in Worcester, Massachusetts, in September 1947 while he was working as President of Worcester Polytechnic Institute.

== Uncredited movie career after 1926 ==
Hollandersky worked as an uncredited movie extra after his move to Los Angeles around 1926. He was often cast as a gangster or boxer. During this period he continued to sell newspapers to the fleet in Long Beach, San Pedro, and on occasion San Diego. He, and his wife Freda operated a small shop and news stand in Long Beach on 715 West Seaside Boulevard not far from the San Pedro Navy pier, where he sold newspapers and items of interest to Navy men including photographs of ships.

Movies in which he appeared include Warner Brother's 1926 lost silent film set during the Spanish–American War, Across the Pacific which featured Monte Blue and Myrna Loy. After his move to L.A., Hollandersky appeared in Fox Film's, 1928 silent film Dressed to Kill with Edumund Lowe and Mary Astor, 20th Century Picture's 1933 The Bowery, and MGM's 1938 The Crowd Roars, among others. Released on February 23, 1930, Hollandersky may have shot his few scenes for Paramount's Roadhouse Nights, when he was back in the New York area to complete his book in late 1929, as the gangster film did most of their shooting in Paramount's Astoria Studios in Brooklyn.

Hollandersky is shown at right with lead actor Monte Blue on the set of the 1926 version of the silent film Across the Pacific.

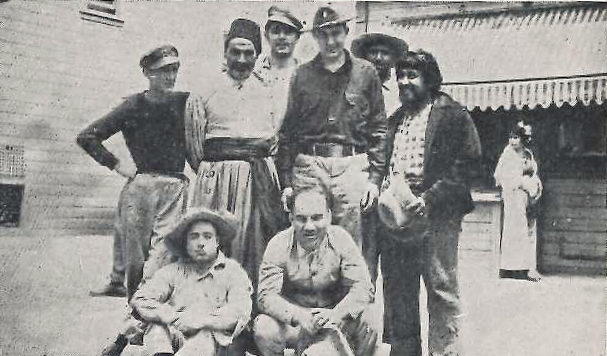
On the set of "Across the Pacific", Hollandersky seated at right with Monte Blue in uniform wearing hat standing directly behind him

Hollandersky, third from left, and boss, actor Fred Kohler, seated on right, tallies the take from his seedy subordinates in "Roadhouse Nights"

Hollandersky appeared onscreen in the gangster film about a bootleg operation, Roadhouse Nights with Fred Kohler. Actress Helen Morgan starred and Jimmy Durante made his musical debut in the scarcely remembered film. Hollandersky's right cauliflower ear is visible when the photo is enlarged.

In The Bowery, Hollandersky was cast with ex-Middleweight Champion Al McCoy as well as boxers "Fireman" Jim Flynn, the only man to knockout Jack Dempsey, heavyweight Frank Moran, and fellow Jewish New York boxers Phil Bloom, and Joe Glick. Hungarian born Texan Jack A. Herrick, another ex-boxer turned actor that appeared in the film, had fought in Panama City eighteen years earlier with Abe, and had faced two of the same opponents while there, the great light heavyweight Kid Norfolk, and "Steamboat" Bill Scott.

In MGM's 1938 The Crowd Roars, Hollandersky was given a rare brief close up after appearing in a background gymnasium scene with fellow Jewish boxers Larry Williams, Maxie Rosenbloom, Abie Bain, Phil Bloom and Joe Glick, as well as the better known Jimmy McLarnin, one of the greatest boxers of the 1930s and a world champion. The film was a commercial success, and starred popular actor Robert Taylor as a boxer caught up in the seamier side of boxing, who while romancing his boss's more refined daughter, comes under the influence of a crime boss.

Hollandersky also claimed to have been cast in movies with world champion heavyweight boxers Max Baer and Jack Dempsey who he knew through his friends, wrestler and movie actor Bull Montana, and boxer Larry Williams. He also claimed to have acted with the great actor and movie director Douglas Fairbanks, another close friend of Montana's.

== Retirement after World War II ==
After WWII, Hollandersky retired to San Diego, where he continued to sell papers. He made appearances, and though sixty years old, still gave occasional boxing exhibitions at the Naval Training Center where he worked with Captains Ralph C. Lynch Jr., and H. C. Gearing. Abe's last place of residence in San Diego was 6056 Meade Avenue.

In later life, Hollandersky continued to meet navy officers and personnel both through his sale of newspapers at bases and at naval conventions and reunions. He was made an honorary member of the American Battleship Association which he last attended in Long Beach in 1965.

He died in San Diego on November 1, 1966, with his funeral service conducted by Rabbi Monroe Levens of Congregation Tiferet Israel. He was buried in San Diego's Greenwood Memorial Park, as was his wife Freda in 1988. He left no children. At his request, his tombstone was headed with his ring name, Abe the Newsboy, the name used almost exclusively by the newspapers that covered his boxing and wrestling career.

== Legacy ==
Memories of Hollandersky would linger in the mind of some of boxing's greatest. In March 1911, in an interview with the Hartford Courant, Abe claimed to have once sold a paper to Jack Johnson, America's first Black world heavyweight champion. Bob Johnston, of Johnston's Sport's Palace in San Diego, where both Hollandersky and Jack Johnson would live and visit, claimed to have once hired a down and out Johnson in 1929 to shadowbox at his adjacent Liberty Theatre. According to Johnson, the amiable champion often told patrons as he entertained them with shadow boxing that his opponent was Abe the Newsboy.

Many hundreds or more of Hollandersky's autobiography remain in print, and grace the shelves of public libraries, nautical museums, and a few U.S. Naval ship's libraries.
