= Trevor Korn =

Australian rules footballer (born 1959)

Personal information
- Full name: Trevor Korn
- Born: 24 January 1959 (age 67)
- Original team: Ajax
- Height: 183 cm (6 ft 0 in)
- Weight: 78 kg (172 lb)

Playing career^{1}
Years	Club	Games (Goals)
1981	Melbourne	3 (1)
- ^{1} Playing statistics correct to the end of 1981.

Trevor Korn (born 24 January 1959) is a former Australian rules footballer who played with Melbourne in the Victorian Football League (VFL).
