= 1903 in sports =

1903 in sports describes the year's events in world sport.

== American football ==
College championship

- College football national championship – Princeton Tigers

Professional championships

- Ohio League championship – Massillon Tigers
- "US Pro Football Title" – Franklin Athletic Club
- Western Pennsylvania Championship – Latrobe Athletic Association
- 1902–03 World Series of Football champion – Syracuse Athletic Club
- 1903 World Series of Football champion – Franklin Athletic Club

Events

- 1 January – the Syracuse Athletic Club defeated the Orange Athletic Club, 36–0, to win the 1902–03 World Series of Football, held at Madison Square Garden.
- 3 September – the Massillon Tigers of the "Ohio League" are established in Massillon, Ohio.
- 17 December – the Franklin Athletic Club defeated the Watertown Red & Black, 12–0, to win the 1903 World Series of Football, held at Madison Square Garden.

== Association football ==
Argentina

- Racing Club, officially founded in Avellaneda, suburb of Buenos Aires on March 25.

Brazil

- Gremio of Porto Alegre, officially founded on September 15.

England

- The Football League – The Wednesday 42 points, Aston Villa 41, Sunderland 41, Sheffield United 39, Liverpool 38, Stoke 37
- FA Cup final – Bury 6–0 Derby County at Crystal Palace, London. This remains the record scoreline in an FA Cup final.

Germany

- National Championship – VfB Leipzig 7—2 DFC Prag at Hamburg-Altona (after extra time)
- The 1903 German football championship is the first to be sanctioned by the Deutscher Fußballbund (DFB). Until the formation of the Bundesliga in 1963, the championship format is based on a knockout competition, contested between the winners of each of the country's top regional leagues.

Scotland

- Scottish Football League – Hibernian
- 1903 Scottish Cup final – Rangers 2–0 Hearts at Celtic Park (second replay after 1–1 and 0–0 draws previously)

Turkey

- Besiktas, officially founded in Istanbul on March 19.

== Athletics ==
- John Lorden wins the seventh running of the Boston Marathon.

== Australian rules football ==
VFL Premiership

- Collingwood wins the 7th VFL Premiership: Collingwood 4.7 (31) d Fitzroy 3.11 (29) at Melbourne Cricket Ground (MCG)

== Baseball ==
World Series

- 1–13 October — inaugural World Series is played between the winners of the National and American Leagues. Boston Americans (AL) defeats Pittsburgh Pirates (NL) by 5 games to 3.

Events

- New York Yankees founded.
- Northern League championship – Winnipeg Maroons win a second consecutive minor leagues title.

== Boxing ==
Events

- Having previously held the World Middleweight Championship and the World Heavyweight Championship, Bob Fitzsimmons wins his third world title when he captures the World Light Heavyweight Championship.
- The inaugural World Light Heavyweight Champion is Jack Root of Bohemia following his ten-round victory over Charles "Kid" McCoy at Detroit on 22 April. Root's title is short-lived as he loses on 4 July to George Gardiner at Fort Erie, Ontario. Gardner wins by a technical knockout after 12 rounds. On 25 November, Gardner loses the title to Fitzsimmons after 20 rounds at San Francisco. Fitzsimmons retains the title until 1905.
- Young Corbett II vacates the World Featherweight Championship. The vacant title is won by Abe Attell who defeats Johnny Reagan at St Louis in the 20th round. Attell is one of the great champions and holds the title until 1912.
- Frankie Neil defeats Harry Forbes in San Francisco by a second-round knockout to take the World Bantamweight Championship, which he holds for one year.

Lineal world champions

- World Heavyweight Championship – James J. Jeffries
- World Light Heavyweight Championship – new title → Jack Root → George Gardiner → Bob Fitzsimmons
- World Middleweight Championship – Tommy Ryan
- World Welterweight Championship – Barbados Joe Walcott
- World Lightweight Championship – Joe Gans
- World Featherweight Championship – Young Corbett II → vacant → Abe Attell
- World Bantamweight Championship – Harry Forbes → Frankie Neil

== Canadian Football ==
- The ORFU adopts the Burnside Rules. The CRU, along with the Quebec and College leagues, refuse to adopt the revised rules. Due to this disagreement, no Dominion Championship is played.
- Manitoba moves its competition to a fall schedule.
- Ontario Rugby Football Union - Hamilton Tigers
- Quebec Rugby Football Union - Ottawa Rough Riders
- Manitoba Rugby Football Union - Winnipeg Shamrocks
- Intercollegiate Rugby Football Union - University of Toronto

== Cricket ==
Events

- Following the conclusion of the Boer War, first-class cricket resumes in South Africa.

England

- County Championship – Middlesex
- Minor Counties Championship – Northamptonshire
- Most runs – C B Fry 2683 @ 81.30 (HS 234)
- Most wickets – Wilfred Rhodes 193 @ 14.57 (BB 8–61)
- Wisden Cricketers of the Year – Colin Blythe, John Gunn, Albert Knight, Walter Mead, Plum Warner

Australia

- Sheffield Shield – New South Wales
- Most runs – Reggie Duff 786 @ 87.33 (HS 194)
- Most wickets – Jack Saunders 32 @ 20.81 (BB 8–106)

India

- Bombay Presidency – Europeans shared with Parsees

West Indies

- Inter-Colonial Tournament – not contested

== Cycling ==
Tour de France

- Inaugural Tour de France is won by Maurice Garin (France)

== Figure skating ==
World Figure Skating Championships

- World Men's Champion – Ulrich Salchow (Sweden)

== Golf ==
Major tournaments

- British Open – Harry Vardon
- U.S. Open – Willie Anderson

Other tournaments

- British Amateur – Robert Maxwell
- US Amateur – Walter Travis

== Horse racing ==
England

- Grand National – Drumcree
- 1,000 Guineas Stakes – Quintessence
- 2,000 Guineas Stakes – Rock Sand
- The Derby – Rock Sand
- The Oaks – Our Lassie
- St. Leger Stakes – Rock Sand

Australia

- Melbourne Cup – Lord Cardigan

Canada

- King's Plate – Thessalon

Ireland

- Irish Grand National – Kirko
- Irish Derby Stakes – Lord Rossmore

USA

- Kentucky Derby – Judge Himes
- Preakness Stakes – Flocarline
- Belmont Stakes – Africander

== Ice hockey ==
Stanley Cup

- Montreal HC defeats Winnipeg Victorias three games to one in a cup challenge.
- Montreal HC and Ottawa HC tie for first place in the Canadian Amateur Hockey League (CAHL) regular season with 6–2 records. The teams play off for the CAHL championship and Stanley Cup. Ottawa defeats Montreal 9–1 in a two-game, total-goals series to win its first Stanley Cup title.
- Ottawa HC defeats Rat Portage Thistles two games to nil in another cup challenge.
- Ottawa Silver 7 sweep Montréal AAA in 2 games

Events

- First ice hockey league in Europe begins, contested by five teams from Princes Skating Club and Hengler's Ice Rink, both in London.

== Motor racing ==
Paris-Madrid Trail

- The Paris-Madrid Trail is run on 24 May with a scheduled distance of 1014 km. It is a disastrous event which causes at least eight deaths including those of drivers Marcel Renault and Claude Barrow. The race is stopped by the authorities at Bordeaux. It is in retrospect sometimes referred to as the VIII Grand Prix de l'ACF. Fernand Gabriel (France) is the first to reach Bordeaux in his Mors.
- Road racing is banned as a result and the legacy of the event is the introduction of circuits, the first being opened at Le Mans in 1906 for the inaugural French Grand Prix, organised by the Automobile Club de France (ACF).

Gordon Bennett Cup

- Fourth running of the Gordon Bennett Cup takes place in Ireland due to road racing being illegal in Great Britain, the scheduled host. The location is the roads around Athy, County Kildare, and the winner is Camille Jenatzy (Belgium) driving a Mercedes
- It is at the 1903 Gordon Bennett cup that international racing colours are formally adopted with Italy taking red, Germany white, France blue and Great Britain taking its British racing green (BRG) for the first time. The British choice of green is partly due to the event being held in Ireland, which at the time is part of the UK, and to precedent as the winning Napier of 1902 had been painted olive green.

Ardennes Circuit

- Second running of the Ardennes Circuit race around Bastogne is won by Pierre de Crawhez driving a Panhard-Levassor 70 hp in a time of 5:52:07. The total distance is 512.05 km (85.34 km x 6 laps).

== Rowing ==
The Boat Race

- 1 April — Cambridge wins the 60th Oxford and Cambridge Boat Race

== Rugby league ==
England

- Championship – Halifax
- Challenge Cup final – Halifax 7–0 Salford at Headingley Rugby Stadium, Leeds
- Lancashire League Championship – not contested
- Yorkshire League Championship – not contested

== Rugby union ==
Home Nations Championship

- 21st Home Nations Championship series is won by Scotland

== Speed skating ==
Speed Skating World Championships

- Men's All-round Champion – none declared

== Tennis ==
England

- Wimbledon Men's Singles Championship – Laurence Doherty (GB) defeats Frank Riseley (GB) 7–5 6–3 6–0
- Wimbledon Women's Singles Championship – Dorothea Douglass Lambert Chambers (GB) defeats Ethel Thomson Larcombe (GB) 4–6 6–4 6–2

France

- French Men's Singles Championship – Max Decugis (France) defeats André Vacherot (France): details unknown
- French Women's Singles Championship – Françoise Masson (France) defeats Kate Gillou (France) 6–0 6–8 6–0

USA

- American Men's Singles Championship – Laurence Doherty (GB) defeats William Larned (USA) 6–0 6–3 10–8
- American Women's Singles Championship – Elisabeth Moore (USA) defeats Marion Jones (USA) 7–5 8–6

Davis Cup

- 1903 International Lawn Tennis Challenge – British Isles 4–1 United States at Longwood Cricket Club (grass) Boston, United States

== Yacht racing ==
America's Cup

- The New York Yacht Club retains the America's Cup as Reliance defeats British challenger Shamrock III, of the Royal Ulster Yacht Club, 3 races to 0 (Shamrock III abandoned the third race)
