= Harry Forbes (boxer) =

American boxer (1879–1946)

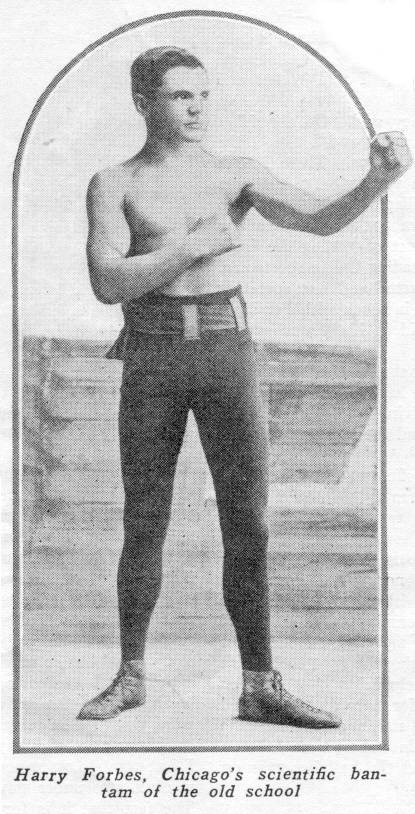

Personal information
- Nationality: American
- Born: May 13, 1879 Rockford, Illinois
- Died: December 19, 1946 (aged 67) Chicago, Illinois
- Height: 5 ft 3.5 in (1.61 m)
- Weight: Bantamweight

Boxing career
- Reach: 65 in (165 cm)
- Stance: Orthodox

Boxing record
- Total fights: 146
- Wins: 96
- Win by KO: 45
- Losses: 20
- Draws: 27
- No contests: 3

Harry Forbes (May 13, 1879 – December 19, 1946) was an American boxer who took the World Bantamweight Title on November 11, 1901, when he defeated Danny Dougherty in a second-round knockout in St. Louis, Missouri. He lost the title three years later, on August 13, 1903, to Frankie Neil in a second-round knockout at the Mechanics Pavilion in San Francisco, California.

He was a prolific boxer who boxed 146 verified matches and faced such bantamweight champions Johnny Coulon and Johnny Reagan, as well as meeting the featherweight champion Abe Attell six times in matches that gained national interest. He also faced boxers Benny Yanger, Tommy O'Toole, Terry McGovern, Kid Goodman, and Joe Cherry.

== Early career ==
Harry Forbes was born in Rockford, Illinois on May 13, 1879. He began his boxing career around the age of eighteen in Chicago by winning eleven of thirteen of his better publicized fights that year. Three were by knockout, though his knockout percentage would increase in later years. He was an early boxing pupil of Harry Gilmore of Chicago, who also taught Tommy White and Eddie Santry.

=== First attempt at the World Bantam Title ===
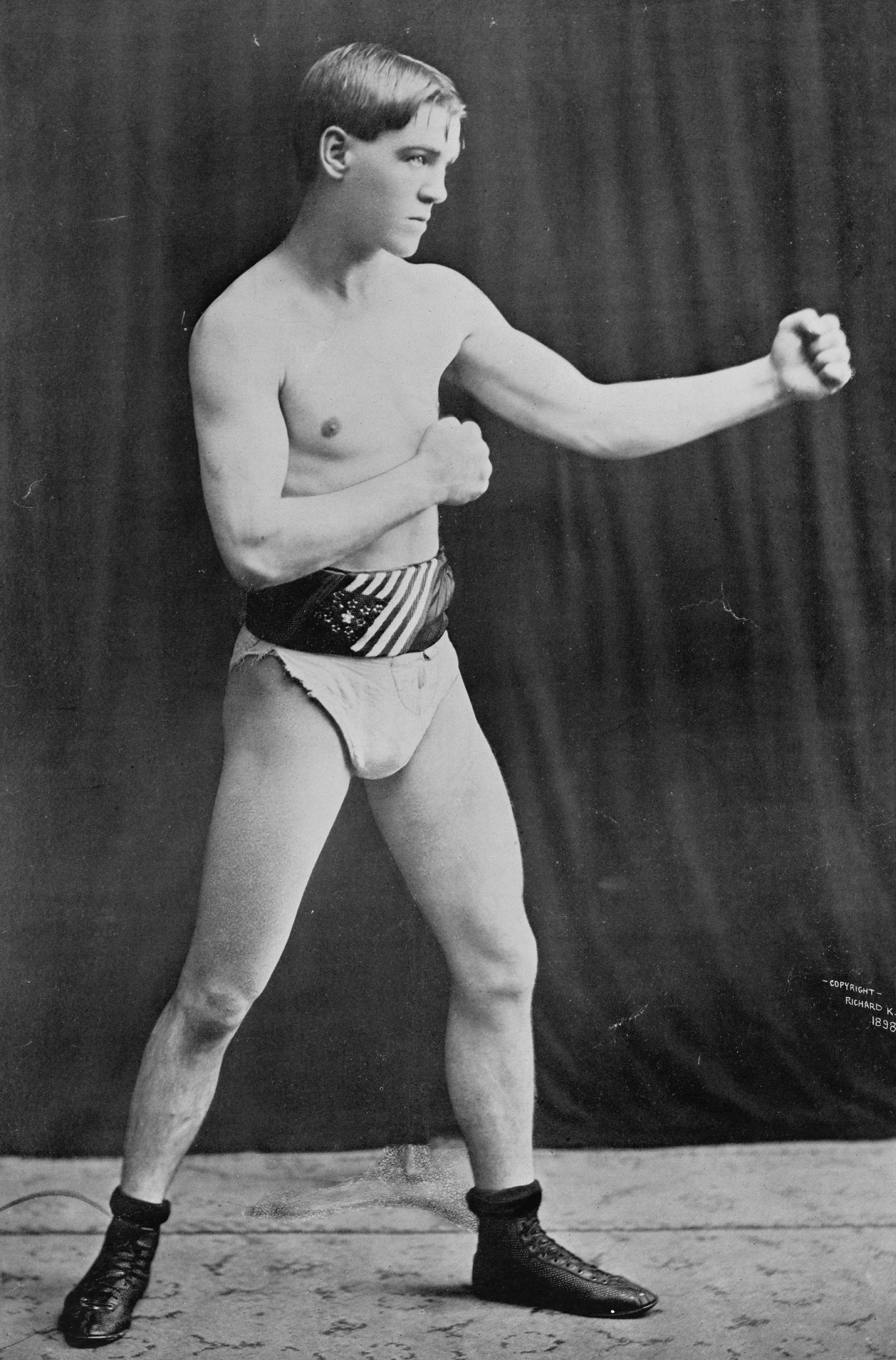
Terry McGovern

His important youthful bout with Terry McGovern, on December 22, 1899, was billed as a World bantamweight title match. McGovern was considered by many boxing historians as one of the greatest featherweights and one of the hardest hitters of all time. Forbes was only 22, though he already had over fifty fights to his name. He lost the Bantamweight Title shot, receiving a second-round TKO at Broadway Athletic Club in New York, with a total fighting time of only 1 minute 33 seconds into the second round. Of his October 1, 1898 non-title bout with "Terrible Terry" McGovern, one newspaper wrote, "He gave the 'Brooklyn Terror' a hard tussle for fifteen rounds before McGovern landed his soporific punch," knocking out Forbes at the Pelican A. C. in New York.

On March 17, 1900, he lost to the exceptional boxer Benny Yanger, in a fifth-round TKO in Chicago, Illinois. Yanger was one of the few boxers to ever defeat Abe Attell.

== World bantam champion ==
When he clinched the Bantamweight title with his win over Danny Dougherty on November 11, 1901, in St. Louis, surprisingly little coverage was featured in most national newspapers, possibly because Dougherty was not as well-known a boxer. The Scranton Republican wrote simply that Forbes had administered a "second round knockout defeat to Danny Dougherty of Philadelphia in what was to be a fifteen round battle." Greater interest would have been generated by defeating a reigning champion who had held the title for a significant period. In his rematch with Dougherty on June 22, 1903, Forbes won in a six-round newspaper decision in Philadelphia in a non-title fight.

== Defending World bantam title ==
His February 27, 1902 bout with Tommy Felz, which he won, was billed as a World bantamweight championship, but his fifteen-round May 1, 1902 World Bantamweight Title match with Johnny Reagan gained greater interest, considering Reagan's stature in the boxing community. The bout was declared a draw, and though one newspaper wrote that in the event of a draw an additional five bouts would be fought, this did not occur.

In May and June 1902, he fought Johnny Reagan, and Young Devaney in World bantamweight title matches, successfully retaining his title.

He had three more important defenses of the title with Andrew Tokell, Johnny Kelly, and Frankie Neil between December 1902, and March 1903, winning two impressively by knockout or technical knockout.

== World Bantam Title loss ==
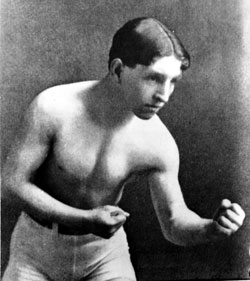
Frankie Neil

On August 13, 1903, Forbes lost the World bantamweight title in a second-round knockout against Frankie Neil at the Mechanics Pavilion in San Francisco, a familiar venue for important San Francisco boxing. According to the St. Paul Globe, the winning blow was a hard left to the stomach of Forbes. Forbes had been a two to one betting favorite prior to the bout due to his standing as reigning champion, though many boxing fans still backed Neil to win. In the brief two rounds of boxing, Forbes had been down three times, probably surprising many in the audience.

On September 18, 1903, Forbes bested Tommy Love in his hometown Philadelphia, in a six-round bout. He did not outpoint his opponent until the last of six rounds, but had the advantage so decisively in that round by his furious punching that knocked Love to the mat, that he won the bout in the decision of most newspapers. Forbes showed his determination and stamina as a young boxer in the bout, though his inability to move decisively against his opponent in the early rounds may have indicated a lack of focus after his loss of the bantamweight title.

== Feather title attempt ==
On February 1, 1904, Forbes met Abe Attell in a World featherweight title Match, in St Louis at the West End Athletic Club. In his typically dominant style, Attell knocked out Forbes in the fifth of a twenty-round match. They had met previously on January 4, 1904 in another title fight which resulted in a ten-round draw in Indianapolis, Indiana. In reference to Forbes' impressive November 4, 1901, fifteen round points decision over Attell in St. Louis, Louisville's Courier-Journal wrote, "Forbes is the only fighter who Attell acknowledges to have ever gained a legitimate decision over him." It was the only victory Forbes would have over Attell, and increased interest in their five additional bouts. The Journal noted that "even money" was bet on their February 1904 meeting, a remarkable achievement for Forbes considering Attell's dominance and reputation, and that the fight would be "one of the best betting propositions offered in this part of the country in some time."

For one of their last meetings, the Detroit Free Press noted that "both boys are past masters in the art of hit and get away," emphasizing that both had skills in evading blows after delivering one, though most historians would consider Attell the far superior tactician. Their first three bouts were a loss in November 1901 and two draws in November 1902, and January 1904. In February 1904, Attell won with a fifth-round TKO, while in their meeting in February 1910, Attell TKO'd Forbes in the seventh round in Troy, New York. Only their January and February meetings in 1904 were Featherweight Title matches, and Attell probably consented to them knowing he had the edge as Forbes had already forfeited his World Bantamweight Title.

In November 1904 and January 1905, Forbes knocked out Joe Cherry twice in bouts in Michigan. Of their November 25, 1904 bout in Saginaw, the St. Louis Post-Dispatch wrote that "The fighting was fierce at all times and the honors were even up until the sixth round when Forbes scored the first knockdown." After the sixth, Forbes had the upper hand, having little fear of Cherry's blows, until he knocked out Cherry in the thirteenth round.

Forbes attempted to retire in 1907, and did not fight again until 1910. One source rates his 1911 bout with the well known Johnny Coulon as the beginning of the final stage of his career.

== Swindling arrest ==
Forbes was arrested on suspicion of swindling and fraudulent use of the mails in 1909. He was sentenced to two years in prison and waged a fine of $10,000 on March 20, 1910. The John C. Mabry gang, of which he had become a part, obtained funds fraudulently on the promise they could fix athletic events in the sports of boxing, wrestling, foot, and horse racing. The gang was reputed to have fraudulently obtained as much as five million dollars in two years. Eighty four men were indicted and fourteen convicted in the scheme that stretched across the territory of many states.

On August 22, 1911, President Taft commuted the two-year sentence against Forbes for swindling and reduced his fine. More surprisingly he appointed him a Deputy Sheriff. The reason given for commuting his sentence was the good behavior he exhibited during his prison term and his aid in convicting thirteen other defendants who were convicted with him.

== Resuming boxing ==
After serving time for swindling, Forbes fought at least twenty fights between 1910, and 1922, when he retired from boxing. He resumed his boxing career on February 28, 1911, against George Ramsey in Troy, New York, winning in a second-round knockout.

One of his last shots at fame was his no decision World Bantamweight Title match with Johnny Coulon on March 28, 1911, in an ice rink in Kenosha, Wisconsin. Most newspapers considered Forbes the loser of the bout. The Trenton Evening Times wrote that they considered the boxers he fought after this last meeting with Coulon strictly "second rate." After November 1911, Forbes lost six of seven of his better publicized bouts including a rematch with ex-Bantamweight Champion Johnny Coulon on January 22, 1912 in Kennosha, Wisconsin.

== Later years ==
Forbes died at Illinois Masonic Hospital on December 19, 1946. He was sixty-seven years old.

== Professional boxing record ==
All information in this section is derived from BoxRec, unless otherwise stated.

=== Official record ===
146 fights	86 wins	17 losses
By knockout	45	12
By decision	38	5
By disqualification	3	0
Draws	26	
No contests	3	
Newspaper decisions/draws	14	

All newspaper decisions are officially regarded as “no decision” bouts and are not counted in the win/loss/draw column.

No.	Result	Record	Opponent	Type	Round	Date	Location	Notes
146	Loss	86–17–26 (17)	Jimmy Katz	PTS	10	Oct 9, 1922	Chillicothe, Ohio, U.S.	
145	Loss	86–16–26 (17)	Paddy Meehan	KO	2 (?)	Sep 22, 1913	Glencove A.C., Glen Cove, New York, U.S.	
144	Loss	86–15–26 (17)	Matty McCue	TKO	10 (10)	Aug 29, 1912	Union Park Pavilion, Racine, Wisconsin, U.S.	
143	Loss	86–14–26 (17)	Oscar Williams	KO	2 (?)	Jul 22, 1912	Paducah, Kentucky, U.S.	
142	Win	86–13–26 (17)	Young Frenchy	NWS	10	Mar 27, 1912	Burlington, Wisconsin, U.S.	
141	Loss	86–13–26 (16)	Johnny Coulon	KO	3 (10)	Jan 22, 1912	Badger A.C., Kenosha, Wisconsin, U.S.	
140	Loss	86–12–26 (16)	Eddie O'Keefe	NWS	10	Nov 30, 1911	New Orleans A.C., New Orleans, Louisiana, U.S.	
139	Win	86–12–26 (15)	Young Ketchell	NWS	10	Nov 17, 1911	Mount Vernon S.C., New York City, New York, U.S.	
138	Win	86–12–26 (14)	Charley Goldman	NWS	10	Nov 14, 1911	Royale A.C., Brooklyn, New York City, New York, U.S.	
137	Win	86–12–26 (13)	Sam Kellar	NWS	10	Oct 10, 1911	Cleveland, Ohio, U.S.	
136	ND	86–12–26 (12)	Earl Denning	ND	6	Sep 4, 1911	Aurora, Illinois, U.S.	
135	Win	86–12–26 (11)	Joe Homeland	TKO	5 (10)	Jul 27, 1911	Aurora, Illinois, U.S.	
134	Draw	85–12–26 (11)	Young Togo	PTS	15	Jul 4, 1911	McAlester, Oklahoma, U.S.	
133	Win	85–12–25 (11)	Joe Homeland	NWS	8	Jun 15, 1911	Janesville, Wisconsin, U.S.	
132	Win	85–12–25 (10)	Young Fitzgerald	KO	3 (?)	May 8, 1911	Gary, Indiana, U.S.	
131	Win	84–12–25 (10)	Young Jimmy Britt	KO	1 (10)	Apr 18, 1911	South Bend, Indiana, U.S.	
130	Loss	83–12–25 (10)	Johnny Coulon	NWS	10	Mar 28, 1911	Ice Skating Rink Arena, Kenosha, Wisconsin, U.S.	World bantamweight title at stake; (via KO only)
129	Win	83–12–25 (9)	Mike Bartley	KO	5 (?)	Jan 25, 1911	Saint Josephs A.C., Fort Wayne, Indiana, U.S.	
128	Win	82–12–25 (9)	Earl Denning	NWS	8	Dec 21, 1910	Windsor A.C., Windsor, Ontario, Canada	
127	Win	82–12–25 (8)	Young Morgan	NWS	6	Nov 8, 1910	Old City Hall, Pittsburgh, Pennsylvania, U.S.	
126	Win	82–12–25 (7)	Joe Hennessy	KO	3 (?)	Sep 11, 1910	Chicago, Illinois, U.S.	
125	Loss	81–12–25 (7)	Abe Attell	TKO	7 (?)	Feb 28, 1910	Troy, New York, U.S.	
124	Win	81–11–25 (7)	Joe Coster	KO	8 (10)	Feb 14, 1910	Bedford A.C., Brooklyn, New York City, New York, U.S.	
123	Win	80–11–25 (7)	George Ramsey	KO	2 (?)	Feb 8, 1910	Troy, New York, U.S.	
122	Win	79–11–25 (7)	Tommy Ryan	PTS	6	May 29, 1907	Menominee, Michigan, U.S.	
121	Win	78–11–25 (7)	Bruce Shearer	KO	4 (?)	Sep 4, 1906	Chenoa, Illinois, U.S.	
120	Draw	77–11–25 (7)	Maurice Rauch	PTS	6	Mar 26, 1906	Springfield, Illinois, U.S.	
119	Loss	77–11–24 (7)	Tommy O'Toole	NWS	6	Mar 5, 1906	Washington S.C., Philadelphia, Pennsylvania, U.S.	
118	Win	77–11–24 (6)	Tommy Murphy	KO	5 (?)	Jan 26, 1906	West Allis, Wisconsin, U.S.	
117	Win	76–11–24 (6)	Young Garfield	KO	3 (?)	Oct 31, 1905	Riverside A.C., Peoria, Illinois, U.S.	
116	Win	75–11–24 (6)	Bruce Shearer	KO	5 (10)	Sep 5, 1905	Bloomington, Illinois, U.S.	
115	Loss	74–11–24 (6)	Biz Mackey	PTS	10	Jun 15, 1905	Findlay, Ohio, U.S.	
114	Loss	74–10–24 (6)	Abe Attell	PTS	10	May 10, 1905	Light Guard Armory, Detroit, Michigan, U.S.	
113	Draw	74–9–24 (6)	Phil Logan	NWS	6	Apr 8, 1905	National A.C., Philadelphia, Pennsylvania, U.S.	
112	Win	74–9–24 (5)	Paddy Nee	PTS	10	Feb 20, 1905	Auditorium, Indianapolis, Indiana, U.S.	
111	Draw	73–9–24 (5)	Gus Hart	PTS	6	Jan 31, 1905	Convention Hall, Niagara Falls, New York, U.S.	
110	Win	73–9–23 (5)	Joe Cherry	KO	1 (?)	Jan 27, 1905	Arbeiter Hall, Saginaw, Michigan, U.S.	
109	Draw	72–9–23 (5)	Paddy Nee	PTS	10	Dec 2, 1904	Kalamazoo, Michigan, U.S.	
108	Win	72–9–22 (5)	Joe Cherry	KO	13 (15)	Nov 25, 1904	Saginaw A.C., Saginaw, Michigan, U.S.	
107	Win	71–9–22 (5)	Dago Mike	TKO	8 (10)	Sep 9, 1904	Democratic Club, Denver, Colorado, U.S.	
106	Loss	70–9–22 (5)	Frankie Neil	KO	3 (6)	Jun 17, 1904	Waverly A.C., Chicago, Illinois, U.S.	
105	Win	70–8–22 (5)	Johnny Kelly	KO	3 (?)	Feb 13, 1904	Chicago A.A., Chicago, Illinois, U.S.	
104	Loss	69–8–22 (5)	Abe Attell	KO	5 (20)	Feb 1, 1904	West End A.C., Saint Louis, Missouri, U.S.	For world featherweight title
103	Draw	69–7–22 (5)	Abe Attell	PTS	12	Jan 4, 1904	Indianapolis A.C., Indianapolis, Indiana, U.S.	For world featherweight title
102	Draw	69–7–21 (5)	Tommy Feltz	PTS	10	Oct 14, 1903	Metropolitan A.C., Detroit, Michigan, U.S.	
101	Win	69–7–20 (5)	Tommy Love	NWS	6	Sep 18, 1903	State A.C., Philadelphia, Pennsylvania, U.S.	
100	Win	69–7–20 (4)	Kid McFadden	KO	10 (10)	Sep 10, 1903	Tammany A.C., Boston, Massachusetts, U.S.	
99	Loss	68–7–20 (4)	Frankie Neil	KO	2 (20)	Aug 13, 1903	Mechanic's Pavilion, San Francisco, California, U.S.	Lost world bantamweight title
98	Win	68–6–20 (4)	Danny Dougherty	NWS	6	Jun 22, 1903	National A.C., Philadelphia, Pennsylvania, U.S.	
97	Win	68–6–20 (3)	Maurice Rauch	PTS	15	May 26, 1903	Vineyard's Hall, Kansas City, Missouri, U.S.	Retained world bantamweight title
96	Win	67–6–20 (3)	Tommy Love	NWS	6	Apr 20, 1903	Washington S.C., Philadelphia, Pennsylvania, U.S.	
95	Win	67–6–20 (2)	Biz Mackey	PTS	10	Apr 16, 1903	Marvin Opera House, Findlay, Ohio, U.S.	
94	Win	66–6–20 (2)	Jimmy Devine	KO	4 (6)	Apr 13, 1903	Washington S.C., Philadelphia, Pennsylvania, U.S.	
93	Win	65–6–20 (2)	Johnny Kelly	KO	9 (10)	Mar 24, 1903	Missouri A.C., Kansas City, Missouri, U.S.	Retained world bantamweight title
92	Win	64–6–20 (2)	Andrew Dick Tokell	PTS	10	Feb 27, 1903	Light Guard Armory, Detroit, Michigan, U.S.	Retained world bantamweight title
91	Win	63–6–20 (2)	Frankie Neil	TKO	7 (15)	Dec 23, 1902	Reliance A.C., Oakland, California, U.S.	Retained world bantamweight title
90	Draw	62–6–20 (2)	Abe Attell	PTS	6	Nov 10, 1902	America A.C., Chicago, Illinois, U.S.	
89	Win	62–6–19 (2)	Billy Finucane	PTS	6	Nov 3, 1902	America A.C., Chicago, Illinois, U.S.	
88	Win	61–6–19 (2)	George Halliday	TKO	1 (6)	Nov 3, 1902	America A.C., Chicago, Illinois, U.S.	
87	Win	60–6–19 (2)	Chick Sullivan	KO	1 (8)	Oct 16, 1902	Saengerbund Auditorium, Dubuque, Iowa, U.S.	
86	Win	59–6–19 (2)	Maurice Rauch	PTS	6	Oct 11, 1902	Chicago A.A., Chicago, Illinois, U.S.	
85	Win	58–6–19 (2)	Biz Mackey	KO	2 (20)	Sep 4, 1902	South Bend, Indiana, U.S.	
84	Win	57–6–19 (2)	Tommy Feltz	PTS	6	Aug 11, 1902	America A.C., Chicago, Illinois, U.S.	
83	Win	56–6–19 (2)	Mike Memsic	PTS	6	Jul 28, 1902	America A.C., Chicago, Illinois, U.S.	
82	Win	55–6–19 (2)	Billy Finucane	TKO	4 (?)	Jul 7, 1902	Chicago, Illinois, U.S.	
81	Win	54–6–19 (2)	Young Devaney	PTS	10	Jun 13, 1902	Elyria A.C., Denver, Colorado, U.S.	Retained world bantamweight title
80	Draw	53–6–19 (2)	Johnny Reagan	PTS	20	May 1, 1902	West End A.C., Saint Louis, Missouri, U.S.	Retained world bantamweight title
79	Win	53–6–18 (2)	Kid Goodman	PTS	6	Mar 13, 1902	Pyramid A.C., Chicago, Illinois, U.S.	
78	Win	52–6–18 (2)	Tommy Feltz	PTS	15	Feb 27, 1902	West End A.C., Saint Louis, Missouri, U.S.	Retained world bantamweight title
77	Win	51–6–18 (2)	Danny Dougherty	KO	4 (15)	Jan 23, 1902	West End A.C., Saint Louis, Missouri, U.S.	Retained world bantamweight title
76	Win	50–6–18 (2)	Billy Rotchford	KO	1 (6)	Dec 19, 1901	Pyramid A.C., Chicago, Illinois, U.S.	
75	Win	49–6–18 (2)	John O'Donnell	TKO	3 (?)	Nov 23, 1901	Chicago A.A., Chicago, Illinois, U.S.	
74	Win	48–6–18 (2)	Danny Dougherty	KO	2 (15)	Nov 11, 1901	West End A.C., Saint Louis, Missouri, U.S.	Won world bantamweight title claim; Won vacant world bantamweight title
73	Win	47–6–18 (2)	Abe Attell	PTS	15	Nov 4, 1901	West End A.C., Saint Louis, Missouri, U.S.	
72	Draw	46–6–18 (2)	Tommy Cody	PTS	6	Oct 21, 1901	Twenty-second Ward A.C., Chicago, Illinois, U.S.	
71	Win	46–6–17 (2)	Mike Bartley	KO	1 (10)	Sep 3, 1901	Watita Hall, Chicago, Illinois, U.S.	
70	Draw	45–6–17 (2)	Jack O'Keefe	PTS	6	Jun 30, 1901	Illinois Park, Rockford, Illinois, U.S.	
69	Win	45–6–16 (2)	Casper Leon	TKO	15 (?)	Apr 2, 1901	Phoenix A.C., Memphis, Tennessee, U.S.	
68	Win	44–6–16 (2)	Casper Leon	PTS	6	Oct 27, 1900	Chicago A.C., Chicago, Illinois, U.S.	
67	Draw	43–6–16 (2)	Casper Leon	PTS	20	Sep 6, 1900	Lake Contrary, Saint Joseph, Missouri, U.S.	
66	Draw	43–6–15 (2)	Jack Ryan	PTS	6	Jul 26, 1900	Opera House, Aurora, Illinois, U.S.	
65	Win	43–6–14 (2)	Walter Bloom	PTS	20	Jul 4, 1900	Fairgrounds, Bloomington, Illinois, U.S.	
64	Win	42–6–14 (2)	Young Gustavson	KO	3 (?)	Jun 15, 1900	Star Theatre, Chicago, Illinois, U.S.	
63	Win	41–6–14 (2)	Young Herzog	KO	3 (?)	Jun 2, 1900	Chicago, Illinois, U.S.	
62	Loss	40–6–14 (2)	Oscar Gardner	KO	1 (6)	Jun 1, 1900	Star Theatre, Chicago, Illinois, U.S.	
61	Win	40–5–14 (2)	Fred O'Neil	KO	1 (?)	May 15, 1900	Tattersall's, Chicago, Illinois, U.S.	
60	Win	39–5–14 (2)	Jim Ryan	KO	3 (?)	Apr 22, 1900	Kensington, Illinois, U.S.	
59	Loss	38–5–14 (2)	Benny Yanger	TKO	5 (6)	Mar 17, 1900	Tattersall's, Chicago, Illinois, U.S.	
58	Draw	38–4–14 (2)	Maurice Rauch	PTS	6	Jan 26, 1900	Star Theatre, Chicago, Illinois, U.S.	
57	Win	38–4–13 (2)	Walter Bloom	PTS	6	Jan 20, 1900	Chicago A.A., Chicago, Illinois, U.S.	
56	Draw	37–4–13 (2)	Jimmy Simister	PTS	20	Jan 6, 1900	Pelican A.C., Brooklyn, New York City, New York, U.S.	
55	Loss	37–4–12 (2)	Terry McGovern	TKO	2 (25)	Dec 22, 1899	Broadway A.C., New York City, New York, U.S.	For world bantamweight title
54	ND	37–3–12 (2)	Danny McMahon	ND	6	Dec 18, 1899	Michigan City, Indiana, U.S.	
53	Draw	37–3–12 (1)	Tim Callahan	PTS	6	Dec 10, 1899	Chicago, Illinois, U.S.	
52	Draw	37–3–11 (1)	Oscar Gardner	PTS	6	Dec 1, 1899	Star Theatre, Chicago, Illinois, U.S.	
51	Draw	37–3–10 (1)	Tim Callahan	PTS	6	Oct 20, 1899	Star Theatre, Chicago, Illinois, U.S.	
50	Win	37–3–9 (1)	Harry Whittingham	PTS	6	Oct 18, 1899	Belle City Opera House, Racine, Wisconsin, U.S.	
49	Win	36–3–9 (1)	Eddie Sprague	PTS	12	Sep 19, 1899	Still City A.C., Peoria, Illinois, U.S.	
48	Draw	35–3–9 (1)	Eddie Lenny	PTS	25	Sep 11, 1899	Coney Island A.C., Brooklyn, New York City, New York, U.S.	
47	Win	35–3–8 (1)	Billy Rotchford	PTS	6	Aug 25, 1899	Star Theatre, Chicago, Illinois, U.S.	
46	Win	34–3–8 (1)	Billy Rotchford	DQ	1 (6)	Jul 28, 1899	Star Theatre, Chicago, Illinois, U.S.	
45	Win	33–3–8 (1)	Eddie Sprague	TKO	12 (?)	Jul 4, 1899	Bloomington, Illinois, U.S.	
44	Win	32–3–8 (1)	Turkey Point Billy Smith	TKO	14 (?)	May 29, 1899	Saint Louis, Missouri, U.S.	
43	Draw	31–3–8 (1)	Turkey Point Billy Smith	PTS	6	May 6, 1899	Howard Theater, Chicago, Illinois, U.S.	
42	Win	31–3–7 (1)	Torpedo Billy Murphy	KO	4 (?)	Apr 29, 1899	Chicago A.A., Chicago, Illinois, U.S.	
41	Win	30–3–7 (1)	Kid Ryan	PTS	6	Apr 19, 1899	Springfield A.C., Springfield, Illinois, U.S.	
40	Win	29–3–7 (1)	Eddie Lenny	PTS	20	Mar 31, 1899	Crescent A.C., Toronto, Ontario, Canada	
39	Win	28–3–7 (1)	Eddie Sprague	PTS	6	Mar 25, 1899	Chicago A.A., Chicago, Illinois, U.S.	
38	Win	27–3–7 (1)	Turkey Point Billy Smith	PTS	6	Mar 11, 1899	Chicago A.A., Chicago, Illinois, U.S.	
37	Win	26–3–7 (1)	Tommy Cody	PTS	6	Feb 26, 1899	Chicago, Illinois, U.S.	
36	Win	25–3–7 (1)	Billy Boyd	PTS	6	Feb 3, 1899	Turner Hall, Chicago, Illinois, U.S.	
35	Win	24–3–7 (1)	Turkey Point Billy Smith	PTS	6	Jan 30, 1899	Seventh Regiment Armory, Chicago, Illinois, U.S.	
34	Win	23–3–7 (1)	Eddie Sprague	PTS	6	Dec 24, 1898	Chicago A.A., Chicago, Illinois, U.S.	
33	Draw	22–3–7 (1)	Tim Callahan	PTS	6	Dec 19, 1898	Fort Dearborn A.C., Chicago, Illinois, U.S.	
32	Win	22–3–6 (1)	Johnny Whittaker	PTS	6	Dec 15, 1898	Milwaukee A.C., Milwaukee, Wisconsin, U.S.	
31	Win	21–3–6 (1)	Willie Purdy	PTS	6	Dec 10, 1898	Chicago, Illinois, U.S.	
30	ND	20–3–6 (1)	Kid Ryan	ND	4	Nov 28, 1898	Hanlon's Court, Chicago, Illinois, U.S.	
29	Win	20–3–6	George Hall	PTS	6	Nov 16, 1898	Chicago, Illinois, U.S.	
28	Win	19–3–6	Jimmy Rose	DQ	14 (?)	Nov 5, 1898	Greenwood A.C., Brooklyn, New York City, New York, U.S.	
27	Draw	18–3–6	Casper Leon	PTS	6	Oct 22, 1898	America A.A., Chicago, Illinois, U.S.	
26	Draw	18–3–5	Johnny Whittaker	PTS	6	Oct 8, 1898	Chicago, Illinois, U.S.	
25	Loss	18–3–4	Terry McGovern	KO	15 (25)	Oct 1, 1898	Pelican A.C., New York City, New York, U.S.	
24	Win	18–2–4	Jack Ward	DQ	6 (?)	Sep 10, 1898	Pelican A.C., New York City, New York, U.S.	
23	Win	17–2–4	Patsy Donovan	TKO	4 (10)	Sep 2, 1898	Lenox A.C., New York City, New York, U.S.	
22	Win	16–2–4	Billy Barrett	PTS	10	Aug 13, 1898	Pelican A.C., Brooklyn, New York City, New York, U.S.	
21	Win	15–2–4	Maxie Haugh	KO	7 (?)	Aug 6, 1898	Pelican A.C., Brooklyn, New York City, New York, U.S.	
20	Win	14–2–4	Larry Lacey	KO	4 (?)	Jul 18, 1898	Chicago, Illinois, U.S.	
19	Win	13–2–4	Barney McCall	KO	4 (?)	Jul 13, 1898	Chicago, Illinois, U.S.	
18	Draw	12–2–4	Johnny Ritchie	PTS	6	Apr 23, 1898	Montello AC, Chicago, Illinois, U.S.	
17	Draw	12–2–3	Joe Bertrand	PTS	6	Feb 28, 1898	Montecello Club, Chicago, Illinois, U.S.	
16	Loss	12–2–2	Johnny Ritchie	PTS	6	Jan 29, 1898	Chicago A.A., Chicago, Illinois, U.S.	
15	Win	12–1–2	Tom Cooney	TKO	2 (6)	Jan 15, 1898	Chicago A.A., Chicago, Illinois, U.S.	
14	Draw	11–1–2	Barney McCall	PTS	5	Jan 8, 1898	Bankers Athletic Club, Chicago, Illinois, U.S.	
13	Win	11–1–1	Barney McCall	PTS	6	Dec 30, 1897	Chicago, Illinois, U.S.	
12	Win	10–1–1	Billy Boyd	PTS	4	Dec 21, 1897	Chicago, Illinois, U.S.	
11	Win	9–1–1	Johnny Gallagher	KO	5 (?)	Dec 12, 1897	Chicago, Illinois, U.S.	
10	Win	8–1–1	Maurice Rauch	PTS	6	Nov 30, 1897	Battery D Armory, Chicago, Illinois, U.S.	
9	Win	7–1–1	Eddie Carroll	PTS	6	Nov 1, 1897	McGurn's Handball Court, Chicago, Illinois, U.S.	
8	Win	6–1–1	Joe Sturch	PTS	4	Oct 23, 1897	Tattersall's, Chicago, Illinois, U.S.	
7	Draw	5–1–1	Fred Woods	PTS	5	Sep 1, 1897	Chicago, Illinois, U.S.	Exact date unknown
6	Win	5–1	Ned Hanlon	KO	1 (?)	Aug 28, 1897	Chicago, Illinois, U.S.	
5	Win	4–1	Ned Hanlon	TKO	1 (?)	Jul 19, 1897	Hanlon's Court, Chicago, Illinois, U.S.	
4	Win	3–1	Mike Bartley	KO	2 (?)	Jul 10, 1897	Chicago, Illinois, U.S.	
3	Win	2–1	Fred Wolf	PTS	4	May 1, 1897	Chicago, Illinois, U.S.	
2	Win	1–1	Maurice Rauch	PTS	6	Apr 10, 1897	Chicago A.A., Chicago, Illinois, U.S.	
1	Loss	0–1	Joe Sturch	PTS	4	Jan 16, 1897	Chicago, Illinois, U.S.	

=== Unofficial record ===
146 fights	96 wins	20 losses
By knockout	45	12
By decision	48	8
By disqualification	3	0
Draws	27	
No contests	3	

Record with the inclusion of newspaper decisions in the win/loss/draw column.

No.	Result	Record	Opponent	Type	Round	Date	Location	Notes
146	Loss	96–20–27 (3)	Jimmy Katz	PTS	10	Oct 9, 1922	Chillicothe, Ohio, U.S.	
145	Loss	96–19–27 (3)	Paddy Meehan	KO	2 (?)	Sep 22, 1913	Glencove A.C., Glen Cove, New York, U.S.	
144	Loss	96–18–27 (3)	Matty McCue	TKO	10 (10)	Aug 29, 1912	Union Park Pavilion, Racine, Wisconsin, U.S.	
143	Loss	96–17–27 (3)	Oscar Williams	KO	2 (?)	Jul 22, 1912	Paducah, Kentucky, U.S.	
142	Win	96–16–27 (3)	Young Frenchy	NWS	10	Mar 27, 1912	Burlington, Wisconsin, U.S.	
141	Loss	95–16–27 (3)	Johnny Coulon	KO	3 (10)	Jan 22, 1912	Badger A.C., Kenosha, Wisconsin, U.S.	
140	Loss	95–15–27 (3)	Eddie O'Keefe	NWS	10	Nov 30, 1911	New Orleans A.C., New Orleans, Louisiana, U.S.	
139	Win	95–14–27 (3)	Young Ketchell	NWS	10	Nov 17, 1911	Mount Vernon S.C., New York City, New York, U.S.	
138	Win	94–14–27 (3)	Charley Goldman	NWS	10	Nov 14, 1911	Royale A.C., Brooklyn, New York City, New York, U.S.	
137	Win	93–14–27 (3)	Sam Kellar	NWS	10	Oct 10, 1911	Cleveland, Ohio, U.S.	
136	ND	92–14–27 (3)	Earl Denning	ND	6	Sep 4, 1911	Aurora, Illinois, U.S.	
135	Win	92–14–27 (2)	Joe Homeland	TKO	5 (10)	Jul 27, 1911	Aurora, Illinois, U.S.	
134	Draw	91–14–27 (2)	Young Togo	PTS	15	Jul 4, 1911	McAlester, Oklahoma, U.S.	
133	Win	91–14–26 (2)	Joe Homeland	NWS	8	Jun 15, 1911	Janesville, Wisconsin, U.S.	
132	Win	90–14–26 (2)	Young Fitzgerald	KO	3 (?)	May 8, 1911	Gary, Indiana, U.S.	
131	Win	89–14–26 (2)	Young Jimmy Britt	KO	1 (10)	Apr 18, 1911	South Bend, Indiana, U.S.	
130	Loss	88–14–26 (2)	Johnny Coulon	NWS	10	Mar 28, 1911	Ice Skating Rink Arena, Kenosha, Wisconsin, U.S.	World bantamweight title at stake; (via KO only)
129	Win	88–13–26 (2)	Mike Bartley	KO	5 (?)	Jan 25, 1911	Saint Josephs A.C., Fort Wayne, Indiana, U.S.	
128	Win	87–13–26 (2)	Earl Denning	NWS	8	Dec 21, 1910	Windsor A.C., Windsor, Ontario, Canada	
127	Win	86–13–26 (2)	Young Morgan	NWS	6	Nov 8, 1910	Old City Hall, Pittsburgh, Pennsylvania, U.S.	
126	Win	85–13–26 (2)	Joe Hennessy	KO	3 (?)	Sep 11, 1910	Chicago, Illinois, U.S.	
125	Loss	84–13–26 (2)	Abe Attell	TKO	7 (?)	Feb 28, 1910	Troy, New York, U.S.	
124	Win	84–12–26 (2)	Joe Coster	KO	8 (10)	Feb 14, 1910	Bedford A.C., Brooklyn, New York City, New York, U.S.	
123	Win	83–12–26 (2)	George Ramsey	KO	2 (?)	Feb 8, 1910	Troy, New York, U.S.	
122	Win	82–12–26 (2)	Tommy Ryan	PTS	6	May 29, 1907	Menominee, Michigan, U.S.	
121	Win	81–12–26 (2)	Bruce Shearer	KO	4 (?)	Sep 4, 1906	Chenoa, Illinois, U.S.	
120	Draw	80–12–26 (2)	Maurice Rauch	PTS	6	Mar 26, 1906	Springfield, Illinois, U.S.	
119	Loss	80–12–25 (2)	Tommy O'Toole	NWS	6	Mar 5, 1906	Washington S.C., Philadelphia, Pennsylvania, U.S.	
118	Win	80–11–25 (2)	Tommy Murphy	KO	5 (?)	Jan 26, 1906	West Allis, Wisconsin, U.S.	
117	Win	79–11–25 (2)	Young Garfield	KO	3 (?)	Oct 31, 1905	Riverside A.C., Peoria, Illinois, U.S.	
116	Win	78–11–25 (2)	Bruce Shearer	KO	5 (10)	Sep 5, 1905	Bloomington, Illinois, U.S.	
115	Loss	77–11–25 (2)	Biz Mackey	PTS	10	Jun 15, 1905	Findlay, Ohio, U.S.	
114	Loss	77–10–25 (2)	Abe Attell	PTS	10	May 10, 1905	Light Guard Armory, Detroit, Michigan, U.S.	
113	Draw	77–9–25 (2)	Phil Logan	NWS	6	Apr 8, 1905	National A.C., Philadelphia, Pennsylvania, U.S.	
112	Win	77–9–24 (2)	Paddy Nee	PTS	10	Feb 20, 1905	Auditorium, Indianapolis, Indiana, U.S.	
111	Draw	76–9–24 (2)	Gus Hart	PTS	6	Jan 31, 1905	Convention Hall, Niagara Falls, New York, U.S.	
110	Win	76–9–23 (2)	Joe Cherry	KO	1 (?)	Jan 27, 1905	Arbeiter Hall, Saginaw, Michigan, U.S.	
109	Draw	75–9–23 (2)	Paddy Nee	PTS	10	Dec 2, 1904	Kalamazoo, Michigan, U.S.	
108	Win	75–9–22 (2)	Joe Cherry	KO	13 (15)	Nov 25, 1904	Saginaw A.C., Saginaw, Michigan, U.S.	
107	Win	74–9–22 (2)	Dago Mike	TKO	8 (10)	Sep 9, 1904	Democratic Club, Denver, Colorado, U.S.	
106	Loss	73–9–22 (2)	Frankie Neil	KO	3 (6)	Jun 17, 1904	Waverly A.C., Chicago, Illinois, U.S.	
105	Win	73–8–22 (2)	Johnny Kelly	KO	3 (?)	Feb 13, 1904	Chicago A.A., Chicago, Illinois, U.S.	
104	Loss	72–8–22 (2)	Abe Attell	KO	5 (20)	Feb 1, 1904	West End A.C., Saint Louis, Missouri, U.S.	For world featherweight title
103	Draw	72–7–22 (2)	Abe Attell	PTS	12	Jan 4, 1904	Indianapolis A.C., Indianapolis, Indiana, U.S.	For world featherweight title
102	Draw	72–7–21 (2)	Tommy Feltz	PTS	10	Oct 14, 1903	Metropolitan A.C., Detroit, Michigan, U.S.	
101	Win	72–7–20 (2)	Tommy Love	NWS	6	Sep 18, 1903	State A.C., Philadelphia, Pennsylvania, U.S.	
100	Win	71–7–20 (2)	Kid McFadden	KO	10 (10)	Sep 10, 1903	Tammany A.C., Boston, Massachusetts, U.S.	
99	Loss	70–7–20 (2)	Frankie Neil	KO	2 (20)	Aug 13, 1903	Mechanic's Pavilion, San Francisco, California, U.S.	Lost world bantamweight title
98	Win	70–6–20 (2)	Danny Dougherty	NWS	6	Jun 22, 1903	National A.C., Philadelphia, Pennsylvania, U.S.	
97	Win	69–6–20 (2)	Maurice Rauch	PTS	15	May 26, 1903	Vineyard's Hall, Kansas City, Missouri, U.S.	Retained world bantamweight title
96	Win	68–6–20 (2)	Tommy Love	NWS	6	Apr 20, 1903	Washington S.C., Philadelphia, Pennsylvania, U.S.	
95	Win	67–6–20 (2)	Biz Mackey	PTS	10	Apr 16, 1903	Marvin Opera House, Findlay, Ohio, U.S.	
94	Win	66–6–20 (2)	Jimmy Devine	KO	4 (6)	Apr 13, 1903	Washington S.C., Philadelphia, Pennsylvania, U.S.	
93	Win	65–6–20 (2)	Johnny Kelly	KO	9 (10)	Mar 24, 1903	Missouri A.C., Kansas City, Missouri, U.S.	Retained world bantamweight title
92	Win	64–6–20 (2)	Andrew Dick Tokell	PTS	10	Feb 27, 1903	Light Guard Armory, Detroit, Michigan, U.S.	Retained world bantamweight title
91	Win	63–6–20 (2)	Frankie Neil	TKO	7 (15)	Dec 23, 1902	Reliance A.C., Oakland, California, U.S.	Retained world bantamweight title
90	Draw	62–6–20 (2)	Abe Attell	PTS	6	Nov 10, 1902	America A.C., Chicago, Illinois, U.S.	
89	Win	62–6–19 (2)	Billy Finucane	PTS	6	Nov 3, 1902	America A.C., Chicago, Illinois, U.S.	
88	Win	61–6–19 (2)	George Halliday	TKO	1 (6)	Nov 3, 1902	America A.C., Chicago, Illinois, U.S.	
87	Win	60–6–19 (2)	Chick Sullivan	KO	1 (8)	Oct 16, 1902	Saengerbund Auditorium, Dubuque, Iowa, U.S.	
86	Win	59–6–19 (2)	Maurice Rauch	PTS	6	Oct 11, 1902	Chicago A.A., Chicago, Illinois, U.S.	
85	Win	58–6–19 (2)	Biz Mackey	KO	2 (20)	Sep 4, 1902	South Bend, Indiana, U.S.	
84	Win	57–6–19 (2)	Tommy Feltz	PTS	6	Aug 11, 1902	America A.C., Chicago, Illinois, U.S.	
83	Win	56–6–19 (2)	Mike Memsic	PTS	6	Jul 28, 1902	America A.C., Chicago, Illinois, U.S.	
82	Win	55–6–19 (2)	Billy Finucane	TKO	4 (?)	Jul 7, 1902	Chicago, Illinois, U.S.	
81	Win	54–6–19 (2)	Young Devaney	PTS	10	Jun 13, 1902	Elyria A.C., Denver, Colorado, U.S.	Retained world bantamweight title
80	Draw	53–6–19 (2)	Johnny Reagan	PTS	20	May 1, 1902	West End A.C., Saint Louis, Missouri, U.S.	Retained world bantamweight title
79	Win	53–6–18 (2)	Kid Goodman	PTS	6	Mar 13, 1902	Pyramid A.C., Chicago, Illinois, U.S.	
78	Win	52–6–18 (2)	Tommy Feltz	PTS	15	Feb 27, 1902	West End A.C., Saint Louis, Missouri, U.S.	Retained world bantamweight title
77	Win	51–6–18 (2)	Danny Dougherty	KO	4 (15)	Jan 23, 1902	West End A.C., Saint Louis, Missouri, U.S.	Retained world bantamweight title
76	Win	50–6–18 (2)	Billy Rotchford	KO	1 (6)	Dec 19, 1901	Pyramid A.C., Chicago, Illinois, U.S.	
75	Win	49–6–18 (2)	John O'Donnell	TKO	3 (?)	Nov 23, 1901	Chicago A.A., Chicago, Illinois, U.S.	
74	Win	48–6–18 (2)	Danny Dougherty	KO	2 (15)	Nov 11, 1901	West End A.C., Saint Louis, Missouri, U.S.	Won world bantamweight title claim; Won vacant world bantamweight title
73	Win	47–6–18 (2)	Abe Attell	PTS	15	Nov 4, 1901	West End A.C., Saint Louis, Missouri, U.S.	
72	Draw	46–6–18 (2)	Tommy Cody	PTS	6	Oct 21, 1901	Twenty-second Ward A.C., Chicago, Illinois, U.S.	
71	Win	46–6–17 (2)	Mike Bartley	KO	1 (10)	Sep 3, 1901	Watita Hall, Chicago, Illinois, U.S.	
70	Draw	45–6–17 (2)	Jack O'Keefe	PTS	6	Jun 30, 1901	Illinois Park, Rockford, Illinois, U.S.	
69	Win	45–6–16 (2)	Casper Leon	TKO	15 (?)	Apr 2, 1901	Phoenix A.C., Memphis, Tennessee, U.S.	
68	Win	44–6–16 (2)	Casper Leon	PTS	6	Oct 27, 1900	Chicago A.C., Chicago, Illinois, U.S.	
67	Draw	43–6–16 (2)	Casper Leon	PTS	20	Sep 6, 1900	Lake Contrary, Saint Joseph, Missouri, U.S.	
66	Draw	43–6–15 (2)	Jack Ryan	PTS	6	Jul 26, 1900	Opera House, Aurora, Illinois, U.S.	
65	Win	43–6–14 (2)	Walter Bloom	PTS	20	Jul 4, 1900	Fairgrounds, Bloomington, Illinois, U.S.	
64	Win	42–6–14 (2)	Young Gustavson	KO	3 (?)	Jun 15, 1900	Star Theatre, Chicago, Illinois, U.S.	
63	Win	41–6–14 (2)	Young Herzog	KO	3 (?)	Jun 2, 1900	Chicago, Illinois, U.S.	
62	Loss	40–6–14 (2)	Oscar Gardner	KO	1 (6)	Jun 1, 1900	Star Theatre, Chicago, Illinois, U.S.	
61	Win	40–5–14 (2)	Fred O'Neil	KO	1 (?)	May 15, 1900	Tattersall's, Chicago, Illinois, U.S.	
60	Win	39–5–14 (2)	Jim Ryan	KO	3 (?)	Apr 22, 1900	Kensington, Illinois, U.S.	
59	Loss	38–5–14 (2)	Benny Yanger	TKO	5 (6)	Mar 17, 1900	Tattersall's, Chicago, Illinois, U.S.	
58	Draw	38–4–14 (2)	Maurice Rauch	PTS	6	Jan 26, 1900	Star Theatre, Chicago, Illinois, U.S.	
57	Win	38–4–13 (2)	Walter Bloom	PTS	6	Jan 20, 1900	Chicago A.A., Chicago, Illinois, U.S.	
56	Draw	37–4–13 (2)	Jimmy Simister	PTS	20	Jan 6, 1900	Pelican A.C., Brooklyn, New York City, New York, U.S.	
55	Loss	37–4–12 (2)	Terry McGovern	TKO	2 (25)	Dec 22, 1899	Broadway A.C., New York City, New York, U.S.	For world bantamweight title
54	ND	37–3–12 (2)	Danny McMahon	ND	6	Dec 18, 1899	Michigan City, Indiana, U.S.	
53	Draw	37–3–12 (1)	Tim Callahan	PTS	6	Dec 10, 1899	Chicago, Illinois, U.S.	
52	Draw	37–3–11 (1)	Oscar Gardner	PTS	6	Dec 1, 1899	Star Theatre, Chicago, Illinois, U.S.	
51	Draw	37–3–10 (1)	Tim Callahan	PTS	6	Oct 20, 1899	Star Theatre, Chicago, Illinois, U.S.	
50	Win	37–3–9 (1)	Harry Whittingham	PTS	6	Oct 18, 1899	Belle City Opera House, Racine, Wisconsin, U.S.	
49	Win	36–3–9 (1)	Eddie Sprague	PTS	12	Sep 19, 1899	Still City A.C., Peoria, Illinois, U.S.	
48	Draw	35–3–9 (1)	Eddie Lenny	PTS	25	Sep 11, 1899	Coney Island A.C., Brooklyn, New York City, New York, U.S.	
47	Win	35–3–8 (1)	Billy Rotchford	PTS	6	Aug 25, 1899	Star Theatre, Chicago, Illinois, U.S.	
46	Win	34–3–8 (1)	Billy Rotchford	DQ	1 (6)	Jul 28, 1899	Star Theatre, Chicago, Illinois, U.S.	
45	Win	33–3–8 (1)	Eddie Sprague	TKO	12 (?)	Jul 4, 1899	Bloomington, Illinois, U.S.	
44	Win	32–3–8 (1)	Turkey Point Billy Smith	TKO	14 (?)	May 29, 1899	Saint Louis, Missouri, U.S.	
43	Draw	31–3–8 (1)	Turkey Point Billy Smith	PTS	6	May 6, 1899	Howard Theater, Chicago, Illinois, U.S.	
42	Win	31–3–7 (1)	Torpedo Billy Murphy	KO	4 (?)	Apr 29, 1899	Chicago A.A., Chicago, Illinois, U.S.	
41	Win	30–3–7 (1)	Kid Ryan	PTS	6	Apr 19, 1899	Springfield A.C., Springfield, Illinois, U.S.	
40	Win	29–3–7 (1)	Eddie Lenny	PTS	20	Mar 31, 1899	Crescent A.C., Toronto, Ontario, Canada	
39	Win	28–3–7 (1)	Eddie Sprague	PTS	6	Mar 25, 1899	Chicago A.A., Chicago, Illinois, U.S.	
38	Win	27–3–7 (1)	Turkey Point Billy Smith	PTS	6	Mar 11, 1899	Chicago A.A., Chicago, Illinois, U.S.	
37	Win	26–3–7 (1)	Tommy Cody	PTS	6	Feb 26, 1899	Chicago, Illinois, U.S.	
36	Win	25–3–7 (1)	Billy Boyd	PTS	6	Feb 3, 1899	Turner Hall, Chicago, Illinois, U.S.	
35	Win	24–3–7 (1)	Turkey Point Billy Smith	PTS	6	Jan 30, 1899	Seventh Regiment Armory, Chicago, Illinois, U.S.	
34	Win	23–3–7 (1)	Eddie Sprague	PTS	6	Dec 24, 1898	Chicago A.A., Chicago, Illinois, U.S.	
33	Draw	22–3–7 (1)	Tim Callahan	PTS	6	Dec 19, 1898	Fort Dearborn A.C., Chicago, Illinois, U.S.	
32	Win	22–3–6 (1)	Johnny Whittaker	PTS	6	Dec 15, 1898	Milwaukee A.C., Milwaukee, Wisconsin, U.S.	
31	Win	21–3–6 (1)	Willie Purdy	PTS	6	Dec 10, 1898	Chicago, Illinois, U.S.	
30	ND	20–3–6 (1)	Kid Ryan	ND	4	Nov 28, 1898	Hanlon's Court, Chicago, Illinois, U.S.	
29	Win	20–3–6	George Hall	PTS	6	Nov 16, 1898	Chicago, Illinois, U.S.	
28	Win	19–3–6	Jimmy Rose	DQ	14 (?)	Nov 5, 1898	Greenwood A.C., Brooklyn, New York City, New York, U.S.	
27	Draw	18–3–6	Casper Leon	PTS	6	Oct 22, 1898	America A.A., Chicago, Illinois, U.S.	
26	Draw	18–3–5	Johnny Whittaker	PTS	6	Oct 8, 1898	Chicago, Illinois, U.S.	
25	Loss	18–3–4	Terry McGovern	KO	15 (25)	Oct 1, 1898	Pelican A.C., New York City, New York, U.S.	
24	Win	18–2–4	Jack Ward	DQ	6 (?)	Sep 10, 1898	Pelican A.C., New York City, New York, U.S.	
23	Win	17–2–4	Patsy Donovan	TKO	4 (10)	Sep 2, 1898	Lenox A.C., New York City, New York, U.S.	
22	Win	16–2–4	Billy Barrett	PTS	10	Aug 13, 1898	Pelican A.C., Brooklyn, New York City, New York, U.S.	
21	Win	15–2–4	Maxie Haugh	KO	7 (?)	Aug 6, 1898	Pelican A.C., Brooklyn, New York City, New York, U.S.	
20	Win	14–2–4	Larry Lacey	KO	4 (?)	Jul 18, 1898	Chicago, Illinois, U.S.	
19	Win	13–2–4	Barney McCall	KO	4 (?)	Jul 13, 1898	Chicago, Illinois, U.S.	
18	Draw	12–2–4	Johnny Ritchie	PTS	6	Apr 23, 1898	Montello AC, Chicago, Illinois, U.S.	
17	Draw	12–2–3	Joe Bertrand	PTS	6	Feb 28, 1898	Montecello Club, Chicago, Illinois, U.S.	
16	Loss	12–2–2	Johnny Ritchie	PTS	6	Jan 29, 1898	Chicago A.A., Chicago, Illinois, U.S.	
15	Win	12–1–2	Tom Cooney	TKO	2 (6)	Jan 15, 1898	Chicago A.A., Chicago, Illinois, U.S.	
14	Draw	11–1–2	Barney McCall	PTS	5	Jan 8, 1898	Bankers Athletic Club, Chicago, Illinois, U.S.	
13	Win	11–1–1	Barney McCall	PTS	6	Dec 30, 1897	Chicago, Illinois, U.S.	
12	Win	10–1–1	Billy Boyd	PTS	4	Dec 21, 1897	Chicago, Illinois, U.S.	
11	Win	9–1–1	Johnny Gallagher	KO	5 (?)	Dec 12, 1897	Chicago, Illinois, U.S.	
10	Win	8–1–1	Maurice Rauch	PTS	6	Nov 30, 1897	Battery D Armory, Chicago, Illinois, U.S.	
9	Win	7–1–1	Eddie Carroll	PTS	6	Nov 1, 1897	McGurn's Handball Court, Chicago, Illinois, U.S.	
8	Win	6–1–1	Joe Sturch	PTS	4	Oct 23, 1897	Tattersall's, Chicago, Illinois, U.S.	
7	Draw	5–1–1	Fred Woods	PTS	5	Sep 1, 1897	Chicago, Illinois, U.S.	Exact date unknown
6	Win	5–1	Ned Hanlon	KO	1 (?)	Aug 28, 1897	Chicago, Illinois, U.S.	
5	Win	4–1	Ned Hanlon	TKO	1 (?)	Jul 19, 1897	Hanlon's Court, Chicago, Illinois, U.S.	
4	Win	3–1	Mike Bartley	KO	2 (?)	Jul 10, 1897	Chicago, Illinois, U.S.	
3	Win	2–1	Fred Wolf	PTS	4	May 1, 1897	Chicago, Illinois, U.S.	
2	Win	1–1	Maurice Rauch	PTS	6	Apr 10, 1897	Chicago A.A., Chicago, Illinois, U.S.	
1	Loss	0–1	Joe Sturch	PTS	4	Jan 16, 1897	Chicago, Illinois, U.S.	

== See also ==
- List of bantamweight boxing champions

Achievements
Vacant Title last held by Harry Harris	World Bantamweight Champion; November 11, 1901 – April 13, 1903	Succeeded by Frankie Neil
