= Johnny Coulon =

Canadian-American boxer (1889–1973)

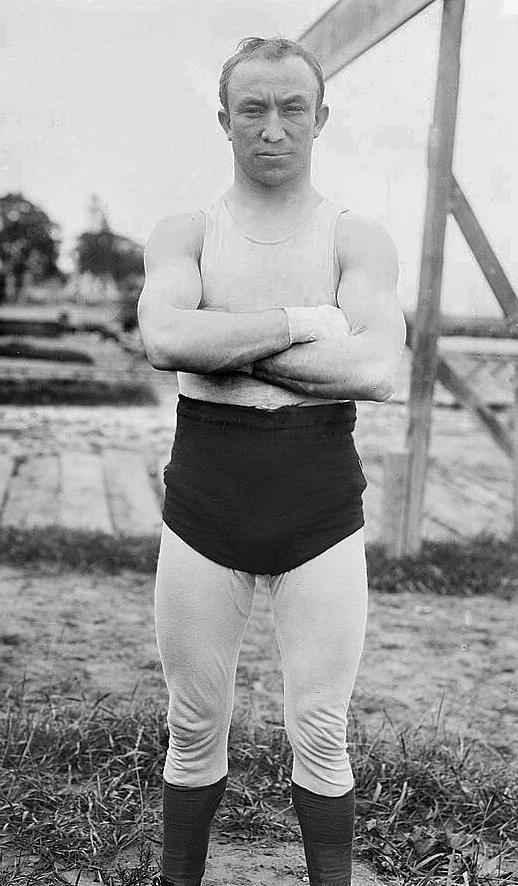

Personal information
- Nicknames: The Cherry Picker From Logan Square; Chicago Spider
- Born: Johnny Coulon; February 12, 1889 Toronto, Ontario, Canada
- Died: October 29, 1973 (aged 84) Chicago, Illinois, United States
- Height: 5 ft 0 in (1.52 m)
- Weight: Bantamweight

Boxing career
- Stance: Orthodox

Boxing record
- Total fights: 91
- Wins: 67
- Win by KO: 31
- Losses: 11
- Draws: 12
- No contests: 1

John Frederic Coulon (February 12, 1889 – October 29, 1973) was a Canadian-American professional boxer who was the world bantamweight champion from March 6, 1910, when he wrested the crown from England's Jim Kendrick, until June 3, 1914, when he was defeated by Kid Williams in Vernon, California. He was also a boxing manager late in life and managed, among others, Eddie Perkins.

As there was some dispute over the sanctioning of the World Bantamweight Title by different boxing associations, other sources, particularly many American newspapers of the day, and the National Boxing Association, which later became the World Boxing Association, recognized his first taking the bantamweight world championship on February 26, 1911, when he defeated Frankie Conley in twenty rounds in New Orleans, Louisiana.

== Early life ==
Born in Toronto to American parents Emile Eugene Coulon (1857–1911) and Sarah Loretta Waltzinger (1857–1923), Coulon grew up in turn-of-the-century Chicago, where, as a prelim fighter, he became known as "The Cherry Picker from Logan Square." In the summer of 1906, at the age of seventeen, he received a life saving medal from the U.S. government, and was matched to fight Danny Goodman in Davenport, winning the eight-round match. According to the Chicago Tribune, it may have been his professional debut, but was certainly not one of his first. He began fighting as an amateur in Chicago two years earlier, once appearing in Kid Howard's Gymnasium, weighing barely one hundred pounds for some bouts. According to his Boxrec record, he won roughly fifteen fights as an amateur, frequently by knockout.

== Early boxing career ==
Coulon turned pro at 16 and was a champion at 21. His career, managed by his father, Emile E. "Pop" Coulon, stretched from 1905 to 1920. Counting newspaper decisions, the hall-of-famer, according to Boxrec, is listed as losing only eleven times in 91 fights, but he claimed to have fought over 300 total bouts.

Coulon won 26 of his early bouts before losing a 10-round decision to Kid Murphy. In a rematch with Murphy in 1908, Coulon reversed the decision and earned recognition as the American bantamweight champion, though the title was billed as the Paperweight World Title, and not recognized as the World Bantamweight Title by all sanctioning bodies.

== Boxing career and taking the World Bantamweight Title ==
After an important win against Jim Kendrick in 19 rounds on February 18, 1910, in New Orleans, Louisiana, he later defeated him again in a nineteen-round battle in the same city where he won by technical knockout. The fights were billed as the "Paperweight World Championships" at a weight of 8 stones, 3 pounds or 115 pounds in American weight measure. Not all sanctioning bodies recognized this fight as bestowing the World Bantamweight Championship. Coulon defended the title against Earl Denning, Frankie Conley, Frankie Burns, and Kid Williams. Three of his opponents were Hall-of-Famers: Kid Williams, Pete Herman, and Charley Goldman, who is best known for training Rocky Marciano. He also faced Harry Forbes, a gifted bantamweight from Chicago, and brother of boxer Clarence.

His April 10, 1910, ten round New York bout at the Marathon Athletic Club in Brooklyn with Young O'Leary was another close affair with Coulon winning by "having only a shade the better of the round." The reporter for the article felt O'Leary was weakened in his attempt to make the 112 pound fighting weight, and thus had a disadvantage in the bout. The fight was considered a title fight for the "Paperweight World Championship at 115 pounds, though both fighters were under that limit. Some sources still considered the fight for the Bantamweight World Championship.

=== Undisputedly taking the World Bantamweight Title ===
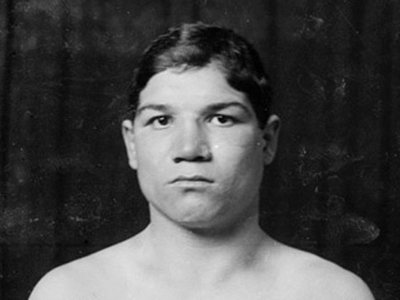
Frankie Conley, World Bantamweight Champion Contender

One year after his win against Kendrick, many sources consider his twenty-round points decision over Frankie Conley on February 26, 1911 in New Orleans, Louisiana, as the start of his reign as bantamweight champion, which he captured at the age of 22. In the historic bout at the West Side Athletic Club, both men gave equal punishment throughout the bout with Conley still able to throw punches in the final twentieth round. Believing Coulon still a clear winner of the bout, the Indianapolis Star, gave eighteen of the twenty rounds to Coulon, though not by wide margins.

Harry Forbes

In March and April 1911, Coulon fought Phil McGovern and Harry Forbes in ten-round no decision title matches in Kenosha, Wisconsin. Forbes had been recognized as the world bantamweight champion from 1901 to 1903. Though there was no referee decision on points, if Coulon lost the fight by knockout or technical knockout before the ten rounds were completed, he still would have forfeited his title. Both bouts went the full ten rounds, and several newspapers gave Coulon the edge in the bouts.

Of his February 18, 1912, twenty-round world bantamweight title fight victory in New Orleans over Frankie Burns, the press wrote that he had the only knockdown in the fast paced and well matched fight and that, "the crowd was loathe to leave" and the "yelling was deafening." As late as the eighteenth and nineteenth round, Burns was fighting back with jabs to the face of Coulon, though the close fight ended with a points decision for Coulon. Both men were fighting hard until the final bell. Part of the crowd's deafening yells were a result of the closeness of the fight and that many felt Burns should have gotten a draw decision. The Washington Post felt that Burns may have had the better of the seventeenth through twentieth rounds.

As a boxer who became a performer, his June 11, 1912, bout with Frankie Hayes in New Haven, Connecticut, was not exceedingly rare in this era of boxing. With the demanding schedule many boxers kept, where injuries and fatigue were both common, boxers would on very rare occasions perform more than box. The bout's original referee Fitzgerald left the ring after the third of ten rounds declaring the bout was a "frame-up" and that the boxers were refusing to fight. That a world champion might fix a fight was rare but not unheard of in this era, as sometimes organized crime exerted major influence on the outcome of fights. A Police Chief Cowles warned both fighters to box, and finally in the fourth round Hayes went down by knockout, though the crowd was not convinced the knockout was genuine or staged. Bouts of this type often left the audience and law enforcement officials wondering if a "fix" was involved due to pressures from gamblers or organized crime to effect an outcome favorable to their betting.

One source noted a slight decline in Coulon's boxing style after the death of his father Emile E. "Pop" Coulon on July 28, 1911, with his telling loss to Kid Williams three years later in June 1914. From July 28 though December 1912, Coulon took a six-month boxing hiatus which may have reduced his competitiveness. His unwillingness to take a new manager after the loss of his father, may have simply reduced his ability to schedule frequent bouts with top boxers and thus reduced his incentive to train. A higher percentage of his better publicized fights in late 1912 were draws, with a lower percentage of wins by decision of the referees.

=== Losing the World Bantamweight Title ===
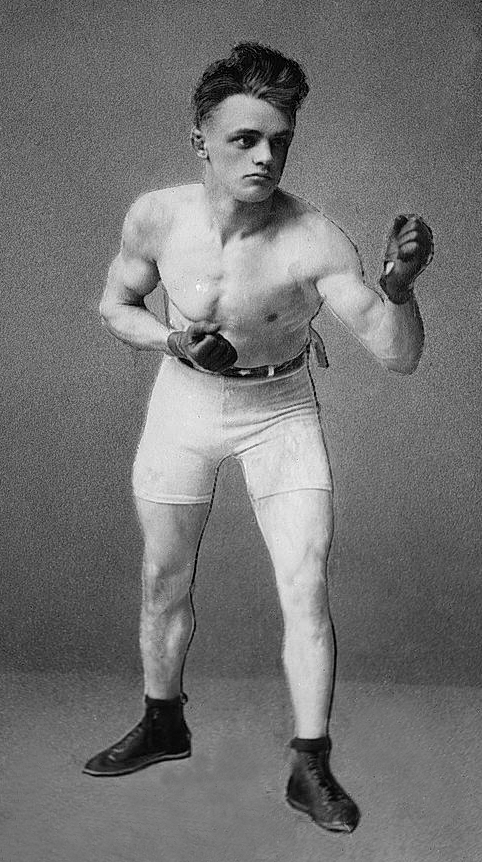
Kid Williams, World Bantamweight Champion Contender

Coulon indisputedly lost the World Bantamweight Title when Kid Williams stopped him in a lop-sided victory ending in a third-round knockout on June 9, 1914, in Vernon, California. Coulon made "only a feeble resistance" in the June title bout with Williams, before a crowd of 10,700, and as he lost the bout in less than nine minutes of total fighting, New York's Evening World, wrote that "he slid into obscurity with barely a protest."

Coulon served in the United States Army during World War I, often instructing soldiers on how to fight. He fought no well-known professional bouts from May 1917 though March 1920, while America was at war. He boxed twice in France after his service stint with Charles Ledoux and Emile Juliard in 1920, and retired from the ring that year with a total record including newspaper decisions of 67 wins, 11 losses, 12 draws, with 1 no-contest.

== Retirement from boxing ==
After retirement, he began public performances with a mystifying stage act. He would appear stripped to the waist and challenge anyone in the audience to try to lift him off his feet. It seemed an empty boast since at five feet and barely 110 pounds, he was smaller than many schoolboys. But those who took up the challenge soon left the stage baffled and frustrated when they were unable to lift Coulon an inch off the floor. Coulon himself never made any extravagant claims that he could violate natural laws. He was content to make a living by presenting a baffling stage act. The trick was that Coulon would feign a struggle, grabbing the opponent by the back of the neck and right arm and applying pressure to a nerve there. Once he even successfully prevented imposing heavyweight Primo Carnera from lifting him off the floor. His act also included what he described as levitation and his appearing to lose and gain weight at will.

=== Marriage and opening Coulon's gymnasium ===
On July 27, 1921, at the end of his boxing career, Coulon married his diminutive Irish wife of over fifty years, Marie Maloney (1892–1984), a native Chicagoan. She never saw him fight professionally, but together they opened Coulon's Gymnasium on the South Side of Chicago around 1923. Marie was the business manager, and helped to match fighters who performed at the gym both as professionals and amateurs. Coulon's professional career was over when they met, but together they saw many of the great boxers train at their gym down through the years — these included Jack Dempsey, Gene Tunney, Jim Braddock, Joe Louis, Sugar Ray Robinson, and Muhammad Ali." Ali would often use the gym to keep himself toned during his exile years. Coulon managed junior welterweight champion Eddie Perkins and light-heavyweight contender Allen Thomas. Coulon often travelled to find Perkins fights even into his 70s.

Ernest Hemingway visited Coulon's and insisted on sparring with the local pugs. LeRoy Neiman sketched boxers working out. A cult movie of the sixties, Medium Cool, filmed scenes at the gym, where Coulon briefly appeared, a tiny old man captured forever on celluloid.

Coulon was not only a topnotch trainer, but living boxing history. He was a close friend of Jack Johnson, had frequented Johnson's restaurant, the "Café de Champion," and served as a pallbearer at the great champion's funeral. He knew every heavyweight champion since the Great John L. Sullivan, trained hundreds of fighters and was a revered celebrity in Chicago during the 1960s. At 76 he could leave a ring by jumping over a top rope, landing softly on his feet. He celebrated a birthday by walking the length of the gym on his hands. He died at 84 in 1973 in Chicago and was buried in St. Mary's Cemetery along with his wife. His gym was later torn down.

== Achievements and honors ==
Coulon was inducted into Canada's Sports Hall of Fame in 1955 (Sport: Boxing; Theme: Strength & Science), was installed in the Catholic Youth Organization's Club of Champions for his contributions to amateur boxing in 1971, and into the International Boxing Hall of Fame in 1999. He was elected to New York's Boxing Hall of Fame on January 6, 1966.

== Professional boxing record ==
All information in this section is derived from BoxRec, unless otherwise stated.

=== Official record ===
90 fights	50 wins	6 losses
By knockout	30	3
By decision	20	3
Draws	4	
No contests	1	
Newspaper decisions/draws	29	

All newspaper decisions are officially regarded as “no decision” bouts and are not counted in the win/loss/draw column.

No.	Result	Record	Opponent	Type	Round, time	Date	Age	Location	Notes
90	Win	50–6–4 (30)	Emile Juliard	KO	2 (10)	Apr 28, 1920	31 years, 76 days	Lakeside Auditorium, Racine, Wisconsin, US	
89	Loss	49–6–4 (30)	Charles Ledoux	KO	6 (15)	Mar 16, 1920	31 years, 33 days	Lakeside Auditorium, Racine, Wisconsin, US	
88	Loss	49–5–4 (30)	Pete Herman	TKO	3 (10)	May 14, 1917	28 years, 91 days	Lakeside Auditorium, Racine, Wisconsin, US	
87	Win	49–4–4 (30)	Bobby Hughes	PTS	10	Apr 9, 1917	28 years, 56 days	Tulane Arena, New Orleans, Louisiana, US	
86	Draw	48–4–4 (30)	Frankie Mason	NWS	10	Mar 30, 1917	28 years, 46 days	Majestic Theatre, Fort Wayne, Indiana, US	
85	Draw	48–4–4 (29)	Steve Flessner	PTS	15	Feb 26, 1917	28 years, 14 days	Momumental Theater, Baltimore, Maryland, US	
84	Draw	48–4–3 (29)	Jackie Sharkey	NWS	10	Feb 5, 1917	27 years, 359 days	Pioneer Sporting Club, New York City, New York, US	
83	Win	48–4–3 (28)	Joe Wagner	NWS	10	Jan 1, 1917	27 years, 324 days	Pioneer Sporting Club, New York City, New York, US	
82	Draw	48–4–3 (27)	George Thompson	PTS	4	Sep 8, 1916	27 years, 209 days	Gritton's Arena, San Diego, California, US	
81	Win	48–4–2 (27)	Kid Julian	PTS	4	Aug 11, 1916	27 years, 181 days	Gritton's Arena, San Diego, California, US	
80	Draw	47–4–2 (27)	George Thompson	PTS	4	Aug 8, 1916	27 years, 178 days	Broadway Rink, San Diego, California, US	
79	Loss	47–4–1 (27)	Eddie Campi	PTS	4	Jul 28, 1916	27 years, 167 days	Dreamland Rink, San Francisco, California, US	
78	Loss	47–3–1 (27)	Billy Mascott	NWS	6	Jul 21, 1916	27 years, 160 days	Rose City A.C., Portland, Oregon, US	
77	Loss	47–3–1 (26)	Billy Mascott	PTS	6	Jul 3, 1916	27 years, 142 days	Rose City Speedway, Portland, Oregon, US	
76	Win	47–2–1 (26)	Johnny Ritchie	NWS	10	Apr 25, 1916	27 years, 73 days	Kenosha, Wisconsin, US	
75	Loss	47–2–1 (25)	Kid Williams	KO	3 (20)	Jun 9, 1914	25 years, 117 days	Arena, Vernon, California, US	Lost world bantamweight title
74	Win	47–1–1 (25)	Young Sinnett	NWS	10	Jan 21, 1914	24 years, 343 days	Lakeside Auditorium, Racine, Wisconsin, US	World bantamweight title at stake; (via KO only)
73	Draw	47–1–1 (24)	Frankie Burns	NWS	10	Jun 23, 1913	24 years, 131 days	Ice Skating Rink Arena, Kenosha, Wisconsin, US	World bantamweight title at stake; (via KO only)
72	Loss	47–1–1 (23)	Frank Bradley	NWS	6	May 12, 1913	24 years, 89 days	Olympia A.C., Philadelphia, Pennsylvania, US	World bantamweight title at stake; (via KO only)
71	Win	47–1–1 (22)	Tommy Hudson	KO	5 (8)	Apr 30, 1913	24 years, 77 days	Windsor, Ontario, Canada	
70	Win	46–1–1 (22)	Charley Goldman	NWS	10	Nov 20, 1912	23 years, 282 days	Royale A.C., New York City, New York, US	World bantamweight title at stake; (via KO only)
69	Loss	46–1–1 (21)	Kid Williams	NWS	10	Oct 18, 1912	23 years, 249 days	Madison Square Garden, New York City, New York, US	World bantamweight title at stake; (via KO only)
68	Win	46–1–1 (20)	Joe Wagner	NWS	10	Jul 2, 1912	23 years, 141 days	St. Nicholas Arena, New York City, New York, US	World bantamweight title at stake; (via KO only)
67	Win	46–1–1 (19)	Frankie Hayes	KO	4 (10)	Jun 11, 1912	23 years, 120 days	Casino, New Haven, Connecticut, US	
66	Win	45–1–1 (19)	Johnny Solzberg	NWS	10	May 8, 1912	23 years, 86 days	Clermont Avenue Rink, New York City, New York, US	World bantamweight title at stake; (via KO only)
65	Win	45–1–1 (18)	Frankie Burns	PTS	20	Feb 18, 1912	23 years, 6 days	West Side A.C., Gretna, Louisiana, US	Retained world bantamweight title
64	Win	44–1–1 (18)	Frankie Conley	PTS	20	Feb 3, 1912	22 years, 356 days	Arena, Vernon, California, US	Retained world bantamweight title
63	Win	43–1–1 (18)	Harry Forbes	KO	3 (10)	Jan 22, 1912	22 years, 344 days	Badger A.C., Kenosha, Wisconsin, US	
62	Win	42–1–1 (18)	George Kitson	TKO	3 (10)	Jan 11, 1912	22 years, 333 days	South Bend, Indiana, US	Retained world bantamweight title
61	Draw	41–1–1 (18)	Johnny Daly	NWS	10	May 25, 1911	22 years, 102 days	Princess Rink, Fort Wayne, Indiana, US	World bantamweight title at stake; (via KO only)
60	Draw	41–1–1 (17)	Eddie O'Keefe	PTS	10	Apr 25, 1911	22 years, 72 days	Hippodrome, Kansas City, Missouri, US	Retained world bantamweight title
59	Win	41–1 (17)	Phil McGovern	NWS	10	Apr 20, 1911	22 years, 67 days	Kenosha, Wisconsin, US	World bantamweight title at stake; (via KO only)
58	Win	41–1 (16)	Harry Forbes	NWS	10	Mar 28, 1911	22 years, 44 days	Ice Skating Rink Arena, Kenosha, Wisconsin, US	World bantamweight title at stake; (via KO only)
57	Win	41–1 (15)	George Kitson	TKO	5 (10)	Mar 22, 1911	22 years, 38 days	Akron, Ohio, US	
56	Win	40–1 (15)	Frankie Conley	PTS	20	Feb 26, 1911	22 years, 14 days	Louisiana Auditorium, New Orleans, Louisiana, US	Won world bantamweight title
55	Win	39–1 (15)	Terry Moran	KO	2 (8)	Jan 18, 1911	21 years, 340 days	National A.C., Memphis, Tennessee, US	
54	Win	38–1 (15)	Earl Denning	KO	5 (8)	Dec 19, 1910	21 years, 310 days	National A.C., Memphis, Tennessee, US	Retained world paperweight title
53	Win	37–1 (15)	Charley Harvey	PTS	10	Dec 3, 1910	21 years, 294 days	Royal A.C., New Orleans, Louisiana, US	Retained world paperweight title
52	Win	36–1 (15)	Frankie Burns	NWS	10	Jun 8, 1910	21 years, 116 days	Manhattan Casino, New York City, New York, US	World paperweight title at stake; (via KO only)
51	Win	36–1 (14)	Phil McGovern	NWS	10	May 12, 1910	21 years, 89 days	Madison A.C., New York City, New York, US	World paperweight title at stake; (via KO only)
50	Loss	36–1 (13)	Frankie Burns	NWS	10	Apr 25, 1910	21 years, 72 days	Clermont Avenue Rink, New York City, New York, US	
49	Draw	36–1 (12)	Young O'Leary	NWS	10	Apr 11, 1910	21 years, 58 days	Clermont Avenue Rink, New York City, New York, US	World paperweight title at stake; (via KO only)
48	Win	36–1 (11)	Jim Kenrick	TKO	19 (20)	Mar 6, 1910	21 years, 22 days	West Side A.C., McDonoughville, Louisiana, US	Retained world paperweight title
47	Win	35–1 (11)	Jim Kenrick	PTS	10	Feb 18, 1910	21 years, 6 days	Royal A.C., New Orleans, Louisiana, US	Claimed vacant world paperweight title
46	Win	34–1 (11)	Earl Denning	KO	9 (10)	Jan 29, 1910	20 years, 351 days	Royal A.C., New Orleans, Louisiana, US	Retained world bantamweight title claim
45	Win	33–1 (11)	George Kitson	PTS	10	Jan 15, 1910	20 years, 337 days	Royal A.C., New Orleans, Louisiana, US	
44	NC	32–1 (11)	Earl Denning	NC	3 (10), 0:55	Dec 20, 1909	20 years, 311 days	Majestic Theater, Gary, Indiana, US	The police shut down the event and arrested the principals, the referee and half a dozen spectators
43	Draw	32–1 (10)	Patsy Brannigan	NWS	6	Nov 22, 1909	20 years, 283 days	Cambria Theatre, Johnstown, Pennsylvania, US	
42	Win	32–1 (9)	Young Ziringer	NWS	6	Oct 22, 1909	20 years, 252 days	Duquesne Garden, Pittsburgh, Pennsylvania, US	
41	Win	32–1 (8)	Tibby Watson	KO	10 (20)	May 28, 1909	20 years, 105 days	Gymnastic Club, Dayton, Ohio, US	Retained world bantamweight title claim
40	Win	31–1 (8)	Jock Phenicie	NWS	6	May 20, 1909	20 years, 97 days	Mars Club, Johnstown, Pennsylvania, US	
39	Win	31–1 (7)	Eddie Doyle	NWS	10	Mar 4, 1909	20 years, 20 days	Whirlwind A.C., New York City, New York, US	
38	Draw	31–1 (6)	Joe Coster	NWS	10	Mar 1, 1909	20 years, 17 days	Bedford A.C., New York City, New York, US	
37	Win	31–1 (5)	Johnny Daly	NWS	10	Feb 18, 1909	20 years, 6 days	Whirlwind A.C., New York City, New York, US	
36	Win	31–1 (4)	Kid Murphy	TKO	5 (10)	Feb 11, 1909	19 years, 365 days	Whirlwind A.C., New York City, New York, US	
35	Win	30–1 (4)	Mike Orrison	PTS	6	Jan 1, 1909	19 years, 324 days	Turner Hall, Kansas City, Missouri, US	
34	Win	29–1 (4)	Young O'Leary	NWS	6	Nov 2, 1908	19 years, 264 days	Roman A.C., New York City, New York, US	
33	Draw	29–1 (3)	Hughey McGovern	NWS	3	Oct 13, 1908	19 years, 244 days	Douglas A.C., Philadelphia, Pennsylvania, US	
32	Loss	29–1 (2)	Eddie Doyle	NWS	3	Oct 13, 1908	19 years, 244 days	Douglas A.C., Philadelphia, Pennsylvania, US	
31	Win	29–1 (1)	Yankee Schwartz	NWS	6	Oct 5, 1908	19 years, 236 days	West End A.C., Philadelphia, Pennsylvania, US	
30	Win	29–1	Terry Edwards	KO	4 (?)	Sep 24, 1908	19 years, 225 days	Badger A.C., Milwaukee, Wisconsin, US	
29	Win	28–1	Young Joe Gans	TKO	5 (?)	Aug 6, 1908	19 years, 176 days	Waukegan, Illinois, US	
28	Win	27–1	Tommy Scully	TKO	9 (10)	Apr 29, 1908	19 years, 77 days	Cubs A.C., Waukegan, Illinois, US	
27	Win	26–1	Hughey McGovern	PTS	10	Mar 13, 1908	19 years, 30 days	Naud Junction Pavilion, Los Angeles, California	Retained world bantamweight title claim
26	Win	25–1	Cooney Kelly	KO	9 (10)	Feb 20, 1908	19 years, 8 days	Peoria A.C., Peoria, Illinois, US	Retained world bantamweight title claim
25	Win	24–1	Kid Murphy	PTS	10	Jan 29, 1908	18 years, 351 days	Peoria A.C., Peoria, Illinois, US	Retained world bantamweight title claim
24	Win	23–1	Kid Murphy	PTS	10	Jan 8, 1908	18 years, 330 days	Peoria A.C., Peoria, Illinois, US	Won world bantamweight title claim
23	Win	22–1	Young Fitzgerald	PTS	10	Nov 1, 1907	18 years, 262 days	Badger A.C., Milwaukee, Wisconsin, US	
22	Win	21–1	Young Fitzgerald	TKO	6 (?)	Mar 12, 1907	18 years, 28 days	Green Valley A.C., Milwaukee, Wisconsin, US	
21	Loss	20–1	Kid Murphy	PTS	10	Mar 1, 1907	18 years, 17 days	Terminal Building, Milwaukee, Wisconsin, US	For vacant world bantamweight title claim
20	Win	20–0	Young Fitzgerald	PTS	10	Feb 12, 1907	18 years, 0 days	Green Valley A.C., Milwaukee, Wisconsin US	
19	Win	19–0	Charlie Kriegel	PTS	8	Nov 15, 1906	17 years, 276 days	Burtis Opera House, Davenport, Iowa, US	
18	Win	18–0	Kid Bruno	PTS	3	Oct 24, 1906	17 years, 254 days	Fox Lake, Illinois, US	
17	Win	17–0	Fred Gaylor	KO	1 (?)	Oct 14, 1906	17 years, 244 days	Fox Lake, Illinois, US	
16	Win	16–0	Ralph Grant	TKO	3 (8)	Oct 11, 1906	17 years, 241 days	Tri-City A.C., Davenport, Iowa, US	
15	Win	15–0	Danny Goodman	PTS	8	Sep 3, 1906	17 years, 203 days	Davenport, Iowa, US	
14	Win	14–0	Fred Gaylor	KO	2 (?)	Aug 6, 1906	17 years, 175 days	Fox Lake, Illinois, US	
13	Win	13–0	Kid Egan	TKO	2 (?)	Mar 20, 1906	17 years, 36 days	Chicago, Illinois, US	
12	Win	12–0	Eddie Berndt	TKO	2 (?)	Mar 2, 1906	17 years, 18 days	Chicago, Illinois, US	
11	Win	11–0	Eddie Berndt	PTS	3	Feb 3, 1906	16 years, 356 days	Chicago, Illinois, US	
10	Win	10–0	Jack Francis	TKO	2 (?)	Jan 21, 1906	16 years, 343 days	Chicago, Illinois, US	
9	Win	9–0	Jimmy Dunn	KO	1 (?)	Nov 24, 1905	16 years, 285 days	Chicago, Illinois, US	
8	Win	8–0	Jack Ryan	KO	3 (?)	Nov 17, 1905	16 years, 278 days	Chicago, Illinois, US	
7	Win	7–0	Peter Kelly	KO	3 (?)	May 18, 1905	16 years, 95 days	College Point, New York, US	
6	Win	6–0	Kid Carpenter	KO	3 (?)	Apr 12, 1905	16 years, 59 days	New York City, New York, US	
5	Win	5–0	George Fox	KO	4 (?)	Mar 14, 1905	16 years, 30 days	Chicago, Illinois, US	
4	Win	4–0	Kid Irwin	KO	2 (?)	Mar 3, 1905	16 years, 19 days	Chicago, Illinois, US	
3	Win	3–0	Frankle Nee	PTS	6	Feb 15, 1905	16 years, 3 days	Chicago, Illinois, US	
2	Win	2–0	Kid Burns	PTS	6	Jan 24, 1905	15 years, 347 days	Chicago, Illinois, US	
1	Win	1–0	Young Bennie	KO	6 (6)	Jan 18, 1905	15 years, 341 days	Chicago, Illinois, US	

=== Unofficial record ===
90 fights	66 wins	11 losses
By knockout	30	3
By decision	36	8
Draws	12	
No contests	1	

Record with the inclusion of newspaper decisions in the win/loss/draw column.

No.	Result	Record	Opponent	Type	Round, time	Date	Age	Location	Notes
90	Win	65–11–12 (1)	Emile Juliard	KO	2 (10)	Apr 28, 1920	31 years, 76 days	Lakeside Auditorium, Racine, Wisconsin, US	
89	Loss	64–11–12 (1)	Charles Ledoux	KO	6 (15)	Mar 16, 1920	31 years, 33 days	Lakeside Auditorium, Racine, Wisconsin, US	
88	Loss	64–10–12 (1)	Pete Herman	TKO	3 (10)	May 14, 1917	28 years, 91 days	Lakeside Auditorium, Racine, Wisconsin, US	
87	Win	64–9–12 (1)	Bobby Hughes	PTS	10	Apr 9, 1917	28 years, 56 days	Tulane Arena, New Orleans, Louisiana, US	
86	Draw	64–9–12 (1)	Frankie Mason	NWS	10	Mar 30, 1917	28 years, 46 days	Majestic Theatre, Fort Wayne, Indiana, US	
85	Draw	64–9–11 (1)	Steve Flessner	PTS	15	Feb 26, 1917	28 years, 14 days	Momumental Theater, Baltimore, Maryland, US	
84	Draw	64–9–10 (1)	Jackie Sharkey	NWS	10	Feb 5, 1917	27 years, 359 days	Pioneer Sporting Club, New York City, New York, US	
83	Win	64–9–9 (1)	Joe Wagner	NWS	10	Jan 1, 1917	27 years, 324 days	Pioneer Sporting Club, New York City, New York, US	
82	Draw	63–9–9 (1)	George Thompson	PTS	4	Sep 8, 1916	27 years, 209 days	Gritton's Arena, San Diego, California, US	
81	Win	63–9–8 (1)	Kid Julian	PTS	4	Aug 11, 1916	27 years, 181 days	Gritton's Arena, San Diego, California, US	
80	Draw	62–9–8 (1)	George Thompson	PTS	4	Aug 8, 1916	27 years, 178 days	Broadway Rink, San Diego, California, US	
79	Loss	62–9–7 (1)	Eddie Campi	PTS	4	Jul 28, 1916	27 years, 167 days	Dreamland Rink, San Francisco, California, US	
78	Loss	62–8–7 (1)	Billy Mascott	NWS	6	Jul 21, 1916	27 years, 160 days	Rose City A.C., Portland, Oregon, US	
77	Loss	62–7–7 (1)	Billy Mascott	PTS	6	Jul 3, 1916	27 years, 142 days	Rose City Speedway, Portland, Oregon, US	
76	Win	62–6–7 (1)	Johnny Ritchie	NWS	10	Apr 25, 1916	27 years, 73 days	Kenosha, Wisconsin, US	
75	Loss	61–6–7 (1)	Kid Williams	KO	3 (20)	Jun 9, 1914	25 years, 117 days	Arena, Vernon, California, US	Lost world bantamweight title
74	Win	61–5–7 (1)	Young Sinnett	NWS	10	Jan 21, 1914	24 years, 343 days	Lakeside Auditorium, Racine, Wisconsin, US	World bantamweight title at stake; (via KO only)
73	Draw	60–5–7 (1)	Frankie Burns	NWS	10	Jun 23, 1913	24 years, 131 days	Ice Skating Rink Arena, Kenosha, Wisconsin, US	World bantamweight title at stake; (via KO only)
72	Loss	60–5–6 (1)	Frank Bradley	NWS	6	May 12, 1913	24 years, 89 days	Olympia A.C., Philadelphia, Pennsylvania, US	World bantamweight title at stake; (via KO only)
71	Win	60–4–6 (1)	Tommy Hudson	KO	5 (8)	Apr 30, 1913	24 years, 77 days	Windsor, Ontario, Canada	
70	Win	59–4–6 (1)	Charley Goldman	NWS	10	Nov 20, 1912	23 years, 282 days	Royale A.C., New York City, New York, US	World bantamweight title at stake; (via KO only)
69	Loss	58–4–6 (1)	Kid Williams	NWS	10	Oct 18, 1912	23 years, 249 days	Madison Square Garden, New York City, New York, US	World bantamweight title at stake; (via KO only)
68	Win	58–3–6 (1)	Joe Wagner	NWS	10	Jul 2, 1912	23 years, 141 days	St. Nicholas Arena, New York City, New York, US	World bantamweight title at stake; (via KO only)
67	Win	57–3–6 (1)	Frankie Hayes	KO	4 (10)	Jun 11, 1912	23 years, 120 days	Casino, New Haven, Connecticut, US	
66	Win	56–3–6 (1)	Johnny Solzberg	NWS	10	May 8, 1912	23 years, 86 days	Clermont Avenue Rink, New York City, New York, US	World bantamweight title at stake; (via KO only)
65	Win	55–3–6 (1)	Frankie Burns	PTS	20	Feb 18, 1912	23 years, 6 days	West Side A.C., Gretna, Louisiana, US	Retained world bantamweight title
64	Win	54–3–6 (1)	Frankie Conley	PTS	20	Feb 3, 1912	22 years, 356 days	Arena, Vernon, California, US	Retained world bantamweight title
63	Win	53–3–6 (1)	Harry Forbes	KO	3 (10)	Jan 22, 1912	22 years, 344 days	Badger A.C., Kenosha, Wisconsin, US	
62	Win	52–3–6 (1)	George Kitson	TKO	3 (10)	Jan 11, 1912	22 years, 333 days	South Bend, Indiana, US	Retained world bantamweight title
61	Draw	51–3–6 (1)	Johnny Daly	NWS	10	May 25, 1911	22 years, 102 days	Princess Rink, Fort Wayne, Indiana, US	World bantamweight title at stake; (via KO only)
60	Draw	51–3–5 (1)	Eddie O'Keefe	PTS	10	Apr 25, 1911	22 years, 72 days	Hippodrome, Kansas City, Missouri, US	Retained world bantamweight title
59	Win	51–3–4 (1)	Phil McGovern	NWS	10	Apr 20, 1911	22 years, 67 days	Kenosha, Wisconsin, US	World bantamweight title at stake; (via KO only)
58	Win	50–3–4 (1)	Harry Forbes	NWS	10	Mar 28, 1911	22 years, 44 days	Ice Skating Rink Arena, Kenosha, Wisconsin, US	World bantamweight title at stake; (via KO only)
57	Win	49–3–4 (1)	George Kitson	TKO	5 (10)	Mar 22, 1911	22 years, 38 days	Akron, Ohio, US	
56	Win	48–3–4 (1)	Frankie Conley	PTS	20	Feb 26, 1911	22 years, 14 days	Louisiana Auditorium, New Orleans, Louisiana, US	Won world bantamweight title
55	Win	47–3–4 (1)	Terry Moran	KO	2 (8)	Jan 18, 1911	21 years, 340 days	National A.C., Memphis, Tennessee, US	
54	Win	46–3–4 (1)	Earl Denning	KO	5 (8)	Dec 19, 1910	21 years, 310 days	National A.C., Memphis, Tennessee, US	Retained world paperweight title
53	Win	45–3–4 (1)	Charley Harvey	PTS	10	Dec 3, 1910	21 years, 294 days	Royal A.C., New Orleans, Louisiana, US	Retained world paperweight title
52	Win	44–3–4 (1)	Frankie Burns	NWS	10	Jun 8, 1910	21 years, 116 days	Manhattan Casino, New York City, New York, US	World paperweight title at stake; (via KO only)
51	Win	43–3–4 (1)	Phil McGovern	NWS	10	May 12, 1910	21 years, 89 days	Madison A.C., New York City, New York, US	World paperweight title at stake; (via KO only)
50	Loss	42–3–4 (1)	Frankie Burns	NWS	10	Apr 25, 1910	21 years, 72 days	Clermont Avenue Rink, New York City, New York, US	
49	Draw	42–2–4 (1)	Young O'Leary	NWS	10	Apr 11, 1910	21 years, 58 days	Clermont Avenue Rink, New York City, New York, US	World paperweight title at stake; (via KO only)
48	Win	42–2–3 (1)	Jim Kenrick	TKO	19 (20)	Mar 6, 1910	21 years, 22 days	West Side A.C., McDonoughville, Louisiana, US	Retained world paperweight title
47	Win	41–2–3 (1)	Jim Kenrick	PTS	10	Feb 18, 1910	21 years, 6 days	Royal A.C., New Orleans, Louisiana, US	Claimed vacant world paperweight title
46	Win	40–2–3 (1)	Earl Denning	KO	9 (10)	Jan 29, 1910	20 years, 351 days	Royal A.C., New Orleans, Louisiana, US	Retained world bantamweight title claim
45	Win	39–2–3 (1)	George Kitson	PTS	10	Jan 15, 1910	20 years, 337 days	Royal A.C., New Orleans, Louisiana, US	
44	NC	38–2–3 (1)	Earl Denning	NC	3 (10), 0:55	Dec 20, 1909	20 years, 311 days	Majestic Theater, Gary, Indiana, US	The police shut down the event and arrested the principals, the referee and half a dozen spectators
43	Draw	38–2–3	Patsy Brannigan	NWS	6	Nov 22, 1909	20 years, 283 days	Cambria Theatre, Johnstown, Pennsylvania, US	
42	Win	38–2–2	Young Ziringer	NWS	6	Oct 22, 1909	20 years, 252 days	Duquesne Garden, Pittsburgh, Pennsylvania, US	
41	Win	37–2–2	Tibby Watson	KO	10 (20)	May 28, 1909	20 years, 105 days	Gymnastic Club, Dayton, Ohio, US	Retained world bantamweight title claim
40	Win	36–2–2	Jock Phenicie	NWS	6	May 20, 1909	20 years, 97 days	Mars Club, Johnstown, Pennsylvania, US	
39	Win	35–2–2	Eddie Doyle	NWS	10	Mar 4, 1909	20 years, 20 days	Whirlwind A.C., New York City, New York, US	
38	Draw	34–2–2	Joe Coster	NWS	10	Mar 1, 1909	20 years, 17 days	Bedford A.C., New York City, New York, US	
37	Win	34–2–1	Johnny Daly	NWS	10	Feb 18, 1909	20 years, 6 days	Whirlwind A.C., New York City, New York, US	
36	Win	33–2–1	Kid Murphy	TKO	5 (10)	Feb 11, 1909	19 years, 365 days	Whirlwind A.C., New York City, New York, US	
35	Win	32–2–1	Mike Orrison	PTS	6	Jan 1, 1909	19 years, 324 days	Turner Hall, Kansas City, Missouri, US	
34	Win	31–2–1	Young O'Leary	NWS	6	Nov 2, 1908	19 years, 264 days	Roman A.C., New York City, New York, US	
33	Draw	30–2–1	Hughey McGovern	NWS	3	Oct 13, 1908	19 years, 244 days	Douglas A.C., Philadelphia, Pennsylvania, US	
32	Loss	30–2	Eddie Doyle	NWS	3	Oct 13, 1908	19 years, 244 days	Douglas A.C., Philadelphia, Pennsylvania, US	
31	Win	30–1	Yankee Schwartz	NWS	6	Oct 5, 1908	19 years, 236 days	West End A.C., Philadelphia, Pennsylvania, US	
30	Win	29–1	Terry Edwards	KO	4 (?)	Sep 24, 1908	19 years, 225 days	Badger A.C., Milwaukee, Wisconsin, US	
29	Win	28–1	Young Joe Gans	TKO	5 (?)	Aug 6, 1908	19 years, 176 days	Waukegan, Illinois, US	
28	Win	27–1	Tommy Scully	TKO	9 (10)	Apr 29, 1908	19 years, 77 days	Cubs A.C., Waukegan, Illinois, US	
27	Win	26–1	Hughey McGovern	PTS	10	Mar 13, 1908	19 years, 30 days	Naud Junction Pavilion, Los Angeles, California	Retained world bantamweight title claim
26	Win	25–1	Cooney Kelly	KO	9 (10)	Feb 20, 1908	19 years, 8 days	Peoria A.C., Peoria, Illinois, US	Retained world bantamweight title claim
25	Win	24–1	Kid Murphy	PTS	10	Jan 29, 1908	18 years, 351 days	Peoria A.C., Peoria, Illinois, US	Retained world bantamweight title claim
24	Win	23–1	Kid Murphy	PTS	10	Jan 8, 1908	18 years, 330 days	Peoria A.C., Peoria, Illinois, US	Won world bantamweight title claim
23	Win	22–1	Young Fitzgerald	PTS	10	Nov 1, 1907	18 years, 262 days	Badger A.C., Milwaukee, Wisconsin, US	
22	Win	21–1	Young Fitzgerald	TKO	6 (?)	Mar 12, 1907	18 years, 28 days	Green Valley A.C., Milwaukee, Wisconsin, US	
21	Loss	20–1	Kid Murphy	PTS	10	Mar 1, 1907	18 years, 17 days	Terminal Building, Milwaukee, Wisconsin, US	For vacant world bantamweight title claim
20	Win	20–0	Young Fitzgerald	PTS	10	Feb 12, 1907	18 years, 0 days	Green Valley A.C., Milwaukee, Wisconsin US	
19	Win	19–0	Charlie Kriegel	PTS	8	Nov 15, 1906	17 years, 276 days	Burtis Opera House, Davenport, Iowa, US	
18	Win	18–0	Kid Bruno	PTS	3	Oct 24, 1906	17 years, 254 days	Fox Lake, Illinois, US	
17	Win	17–0	Fred Gaylor	KO	1 (?)	Oct 14, 1906	17 years, 244 days	Fox Lake, Illinois, US	
16	Win	16–0	Ralph Grant	TKO	3 (8)	Oct 11, 1906	17 years, 241 days	Tri-City A.C., Davenport, Iowa, US	
15	Win	15–0	Danny Goodman	PTS	8	Sep 3, 1906	17 years, 203 days	Davenport, Iowa, US	
14	Win	14–0	Fred Gaylor	KO	2 (?)	Aug 6, 1906	17 years, 175 days	Fox Lake, Illinois, US	
13	Win	13–0	Kid Egan	TKO	2 (?)	Mar 20, 1906	17 years, 36 days	Chicago, Illinois, US	
12	Win	12–0	Eddie Berndt	TKO	2 (?)	Mar 2, 1906	17 years, 18 days	Chicago, Illinois, US	
11	Win	11–0	Eddie Berndt	PTS	3	Feb 3, 1906	16 years, 356 days	Chicago, Illinois, US	
10	Win	10–0	Jack Francis	TKO	2 (?)	Jan 21, 1906	16 years, 343 days	Chicago, Illinois, US	
9	Win	9–0	Jimmy Dunn	KO	1 (?)	Nov 24, 1905	16 years, 285 days	Chicago, Illinois, US	
8	Win	8–0	Jack Ryan	KO	3 (?)	Nov 17, 1905	16 years, 278 days	Chicago, Illinois, US	
7	Win	7–0	Peter Kelly	KO	3 (?)	May 18, 1905	16 years, 95 days	College Point, New York, US	
6	Win	6–0	Kid Carpenter	KO	3 (?)	Apr 12, 1905	16 years, 59 days	New York City, New York, US	
5	Win	5–0	George Fox	KO	4 (?)	Mar 14, 1905	16 years, 30 days	Chicago, Illinois, US	
4	Win	4–0	Kid Irwin	KO	2 (?)	Mar 3, 1905	16 years, 19 days	Chicago, Illinois, US	
3	Win	3–0	Frankle Nee	PTS	6	Feb 15, 1905	16 years, 3 days	Chicago, Illinois, US	
2	Win	2–0	Kid Burns	PTS	6	Jan 24, 1905	15 years, 347 days	Chicago, Illinois, US	
1	Win	1–0	Young Bennie	KO	6 (6)	Jan 18, 1905	15 years, 341 days	Chicago, Illinois, US	

== See also ==
- List of bantamweight boxing champions

Achievements
Vacant Title last held by Frankie Conley	World Bantamweight Champion; 26 February 1911 – 3 June 1914	Succeeded by Kid Williams
