= 1903 World Allround Speed Skating Championships =

International speed skating competition

World Allround Speed Skating Championships
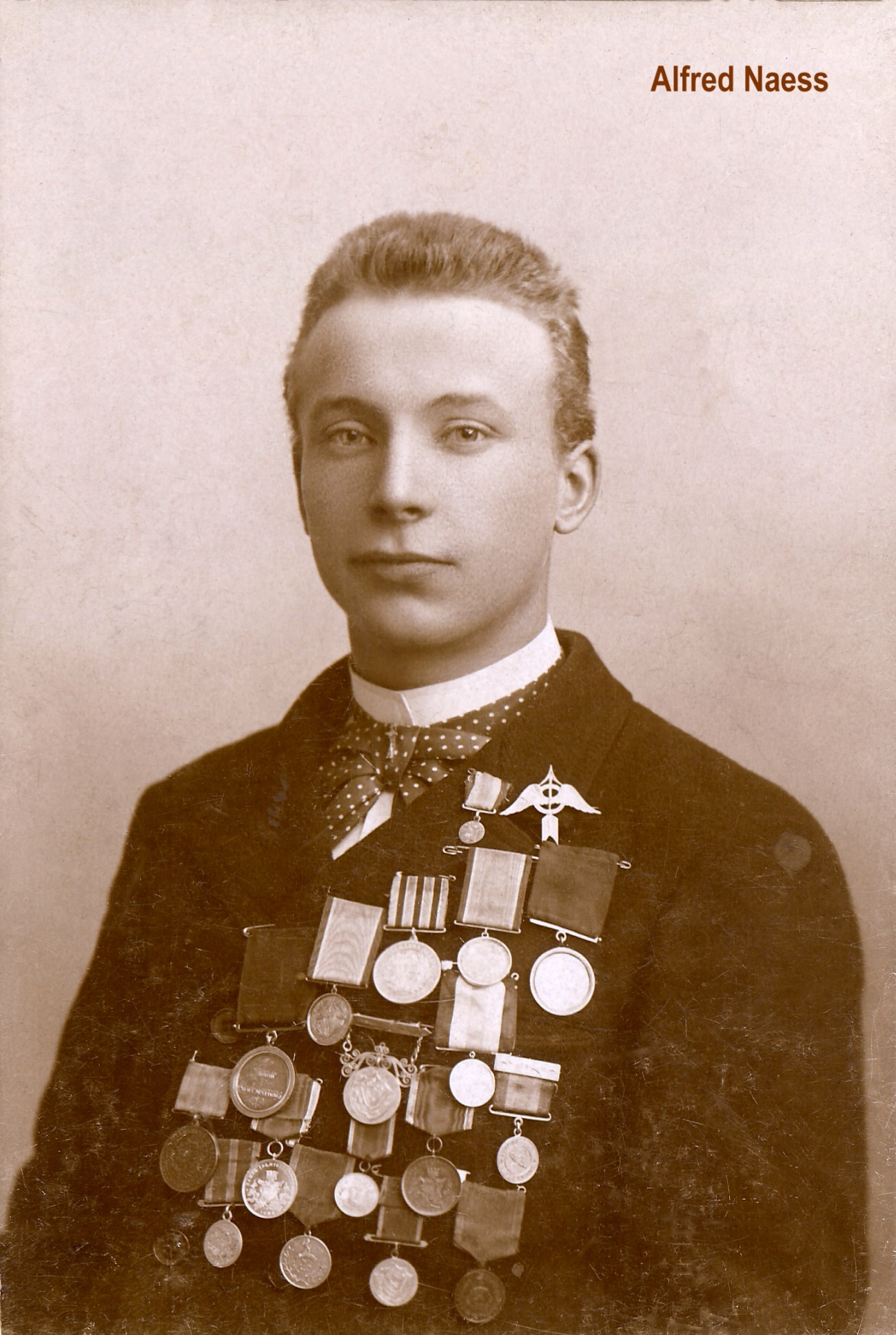
- Alfred Naess; Participated in the 1903 World Championship
- Venue: Market Place, Saint Petersburg, Russia
- Dates: 20–21 March
- Competitors: 15 from 5 nations

Medalist men
1st place, gold medalist(s)		None declared

The 1903 World Allround Speed Skating Championships took place at 20 and 21 March 1903 at the ice rink Market Place in Saint Petersburg, Russia.

There was no defending champion. No one won at least three distances and so no World champion was declared.

== Allround results ==
Place	Athlete	Country	500m	5000m	1500m	10000m
NC1	Johan Schwartz	Norway	50.0 (2)	10:15.2 (3)	2:59.0 (1)	22:47.6 (3)
NC2	Theodor Bønsnæs	Norway	50.6 (4)	10:08.4 (2)	3:04.4 (5)	22:15.0 (1)
NC3	Sigurd Mathisen	Norway	51.2 (5)	10:23.0 (6)	3:02.4 (4)	22:43.4 (2)
NC4	Grigori Kiseljov	Russia	52.6 (9)	10:08.0 (1)	3:12.6 (11)	22:48.2 (4)
NC5	Konrad Liljeberg	Finland	55.0 (13)	10:20.0 (5)	3:10.6 (10)	23:51.8 (6)
NC6	Sergey Grigoryev	Russia	53.2 (10)	10:33.2 (8)	3:17.0 (13)	24:29.0 (7)
NC	Franz Wathén	Finland	49.4 (1)	10:17.0 (4)	3:01.0 (2)	NF
NC	Johan Vikander	Finland	51.4 (7)	10:34.0 (9)	3:04.6 (6)	NS
NC	Miltiades Mannó	Hungary	50.4 (3)	NF	3:05.6 (7)	NS
NC	Toivo Tillander	Finland	51.2 (5)	10:36.8 (10)	3:02.2 (3)	NS
NC	Theodor Baltscheffski	Finland	53.6 (11)	11:33.6 (13)	3:19.8 (14)	NS
NC	Jussi Wiinikainen	Finland	52.0 (8)	10:52.6 (12)	3:09.0 (9)	NS
NC	Gösta Hägg	Finland	54.0 (12)	10:25.8 (7)	3:07.6 (8)	NS
NC	Erik Thour	Sweden	55.4 (14)	10:46.0 (11)	NS	23:05.8 (5)
NC	Fyodor Zhakin	Russia	NS	NS	3:15.8 (12)	NS

* = Fell
NC = Not classified
NF = Not finished
NS = Not started
DQ = Disqualified

Source: SpeedSkatingStats.com

== Rules ==
Four distances have to be skated:

- 500m
- 1500m
- 5000m
- 10000m

One could only win the World Championships by winning at least three of the four distances, so there would be no World Champion if no skater won at least three distances.

Silver and bronze medals were not awarded.
