= Frankie Neil =

American boxer (1883-1970)

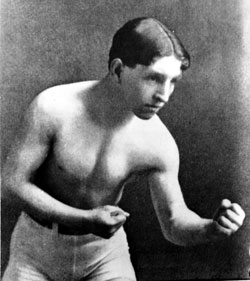

Personal information
- Nationality: American
- Born: Francis James Neil; July 25, 1883 San Francisco, California
- Died: March 6, 1970 (aged 86) Point Richmond, California
- Height: 5 ft 4.5 in (1.64 m)
- Weight: bantamweight

Boxing career
- Reach: 64.5 in (164 cm)
- Stance: Orthodox

Boxing record
- Total fights: 47
- Wins: 23
- Win by KO: 17
- Losses: 19
- Draws: 5

Frankie Neil (July 25, 1883 – March 6, 1970) was a World Bantamweight champion. Fighting at 114 1/2 pounds, he took the world title from reigning champion Harry Forbes on August 13, 1903, at the Mechanics Pavilion in San Francisco in a second-round knockout of a match scheduled for twenty rounds. Eddie Graney was the referee. Neil held the title only a little over a year, losing it on October 17, 1904, to British boxing champion Joe Bowker.

Neil later was reputed to have lost much of his boxing fortune at the horse track and from investing in race horses. He worked for Standard Oil in his retirement from boxing.

== Early career ==
Not long before his first attempt at the bantamweight championship, on April 11, 1902, Neil fought a grueling fifteen-round draw against Eddie Hanlon, who was only seventeen at the time. The lengthy bout was considered an epic one, and both boxers later remarked to the Oakland Tribune that they were completely exhausted after the bout. Their close bout in Oakland, California, was marked by Neil's skills at fighting from a distance, as the Tribune noting Neil's defensive skills wrote, "At long range Neil was by far the cleverer of the two and he landed repeatedly on Hanlon...." Neil's scientific boxing skills were noted in the battle when the Tribune wrote, though Hanlon appeared the stronger, more aggressive boxer, "Neil had the cleaner punch and landed as often as Hanlon, but did not have the force to his blows."

Neil first tried for the bantamweight title against Harry Forbes on December 23, 1902, but lost in a seventh-round TKO in Oakland, California. In a wind up to the title between November 1900 and March 1902, Neal won an impressive seven of eight bouts in the San Francisco area by early knockout or technical knockout. During the two year windup, he fought against such competent boxers as George White, George Margarini, Tommy Dixon, and Kid Malone.

== World Bantamweight champion ==
Neil took the world title from reigning champion Harry Forbes on August 13, 1903, at the Mechanics Pavilion in San Francisco in a second-round knockout of a match scheduled for twenty rounds. According to the St. Paul Globe, the winning blow was a hard left to the stomach of Forbes. Forbes had been a two to one betting favorite prior to the bout due to his standing as reigning champion, though many boxing fans still backed Neil to win. In the brief two rounds of boxing, Forbes had been down three times, probably surprising many in the audience.

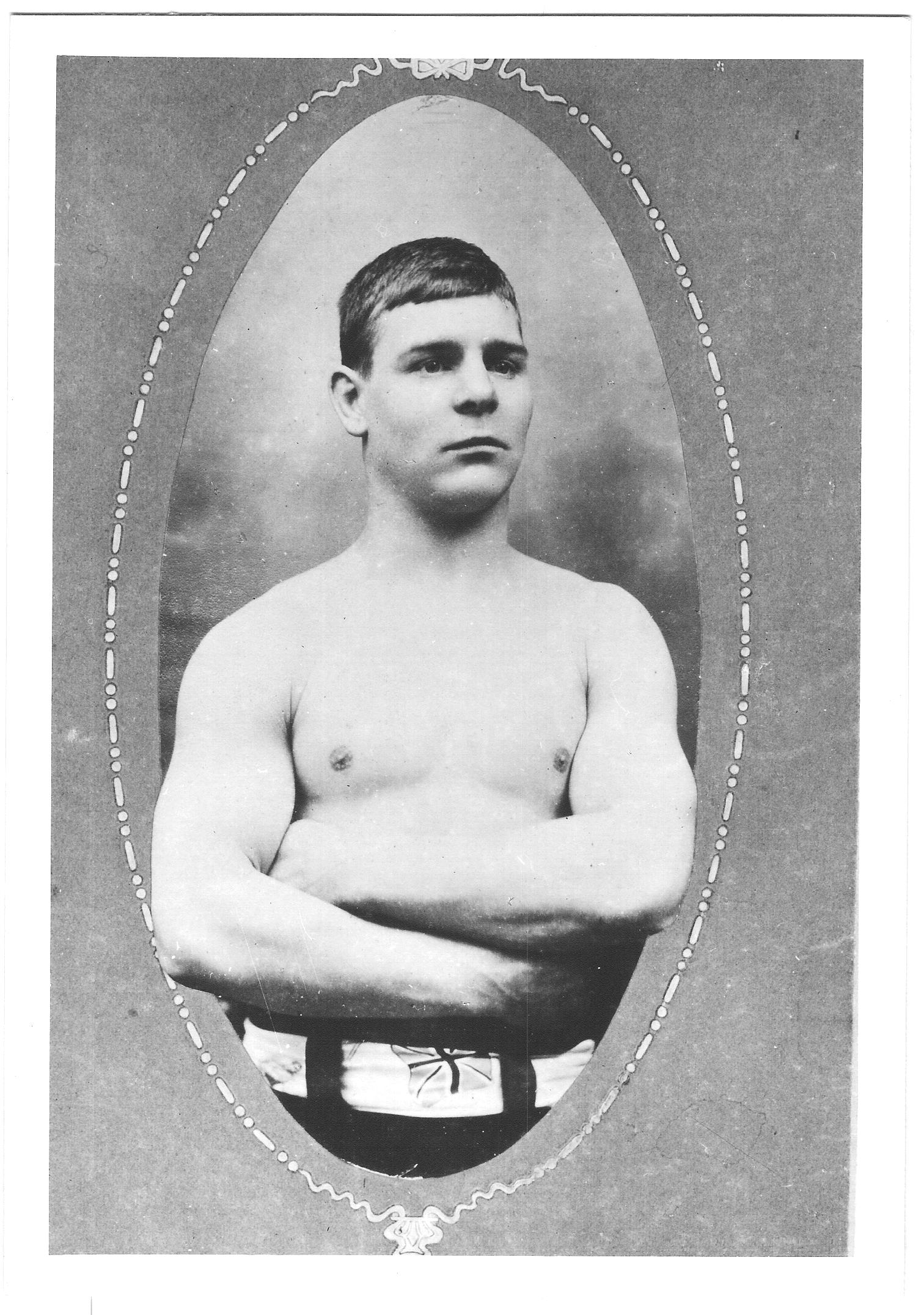
Joe Bowker, 1904 Bantamweight Champion

According to at least the World Boxing Association, Neil lost the World Bantamweight title on October 17, 1904, to British boxer Joe Bowker at the National Sporting Club in London in an historic twenty round points decision. As globally recognized boxing associations with the ability to sanction titles were in their infancy in 1904, some dispute as to when Neil lost his title may exist in news articles of the period.

Neil took the American Bantamweight Title from Harry Tenny on July 28, 1905, in a twenty-five round bout at the Colma Club in Colma, California. Six months later, on February 28, 1906, he knocked out Tenny in the fourteenth round at the Mechanics Pavilion in San Francisco, a frequent venue for Neil. According to the San Francisco Examiner, Neil had won from "start to finish". Tragically, Tenny died the following day of injuries sustained during or aggravated by the bout. Neil claimed years later in an interview that he was never able to hit with the same ferocity after hearing of the death of Tenny.

== Attempt at Featherweight title ==
On July 4, 1906, Neil would move up a class and take a shot at the World Featherweight Championship against the exceptional reigning champion Abe Attell, who had held the title since 1902, but would retain it for an additional six years. He lost the 20 round bout in a points decision at the Naud Junction Pavilion in Los Angeles. The length of the fight may have been a result of Neil's skills as a boxer, or Attell's desire to stretch the bout feeling well matched with Neil. Of their 1906 meeting, the Los Angeles Herald wrote in pre-fight publicity that "The bout will be one of the greatest ever held in Los Angeles, and will attract attention from all over the world, in as much as a world championship is at stake and the battlers are rated as among the cleverest boxers in the ring." The Herald also noted "Neil is more of a fighter than a boxer" and it is "seldom that any featherweight has shown the brand of a punch possessed by Neil." Neil may have been considered a clever scientific boxer by some, but these skills, in the opinion of most boxing historians, were far surpassed by those of Attell. In December 1906, Neil wrote an article for the Oakland Tribune noting that he was robbed by the referee in the decision against him in his July 4 bout with Attell in Los Angeles, and that he had given Attell, the "worst licking of his career." It is questionable if most of the boxing fans present would have agreed with Neil.

Neil would lose to Attell again at Dreamland Rink in San Francisco on January 31, 1908, in a thirteenth of twenty-round TKO. Years later, in an interview in 1961, Attell claimed he had been motivated to beat Neil as a result of anti-semitic remarks he had heard Neil, whom he had known since childhood, make during the fight.

== Boxing decline, 1907 ==
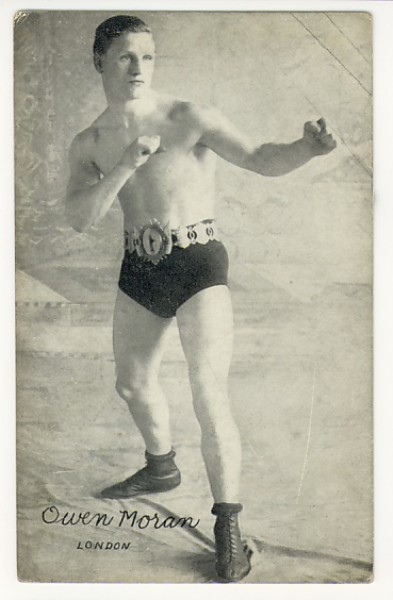
Owen Moran, Hall of Fame boxer

In his ill-advised comeback to the ring on November 22, 1907, Neil lost badly to the accomplished boxer Owen Moran at the Dreamland Rink in San Francisco. As noted by The San Francisco Call, of his eight-month hiatus from boxing, "it is this letup which is the factor that is hard to estimate in figuring upon his chances." Though sometimes taking on top talent, such as Young Brit, and Monte Attell, Neil lost 13 of 21 of his better publicized bouts after his loss to Moran.

Neil would then lose to the great lightweight boxer Ad Wolgast in Milwaukee, Wisconsin, in a ten-round points decision on May 6, 1908.

== Last Bantam title shot ==
On June 19, 1909, Neil would unsuccessfully attempt to retake the then vacant World Bantamweight Title from Monte Attell, brother of Abe, but lose in an eighteen of twenty-round knockout in Colma, California. Monte Attell would take the title and hold it for several years. According to the Oakland Tribune, Attell won every round. Neil was knocked out by a full left under the chin in the eighteenth round, but was markedly tired by the fifteenth. According to the Tribune, Attell was observed to be chewing gum in the eighth round, a tactic used by his featherweight championship brother Abe. The Tribune wrote that Neil was not the boxer of the caliber he had been a few years previously, though Attell was a boxer of exceptional skill.

== Later life and death ==
Neil was working for Standard Oil in Richmond, California by June 1926, and had lived in Richmond since the early 1920s. In 1926, he would on occasion referee boxing matches at El Cerito, and Richmond, California. He had previously lost his boxing fortune from investing in a large stable of race horses and from his personal losses from betting on the races.

He died on March 6, 1970, at 86, in Richmond, California after an illness of several months, and was buried three days later at Mt. Olivet Cemetery in the South San Francisco suburb of Colma. Neil had been working as a janitor at a local Post Office in his later years, living at Point Richmond.

== Professional boxing record ==
All information in this section is derived from BoxRec, unless otherwise stated.

=== Official record ===
58 fights	27 wins	13 losses
By knockout	24	5
By decision	1	8
By disqualification	2	0
Draws	4	
No contests	1	
Newspaper decisions/draws	13	

All newspaper decisions are officially regarded as “no decision” bouts and are not counted to the win/loss/draw column.

No.	Result	Record	Opponent	Type	Round	Date	Location	Notes
58	Loss	27–13–4 (13)	Willie Jones	TKO	13 (15)	Feb 25, 1910	Albaugh Theater, Baltimore, Maryland, U.S.	
57	Loss	27–12–4 (13)	Abe Attell	NWS	10	Feb 24, 1910	Long Acre A.C., New York City, New York, U.S.	
56	Win	27–12–4 (12)	Young Britt	DQ	13 (15)	Jan 28, 1910	Albaugh Theater, Baltimore, Maryland, U.S.	
55	Loss	26–12–4 (12)	Billy Lauder	PTS	15	Sep 29, 1909	Larson's Pavillion, Vancouver, British Columbia, Canada	
54	Win	26–11–4 (12)	Patsy McKenna	KO	1 (15)	Sep 10, 1909	North Vancouver, British Columbia, Canada	
53	Loss	25–11–4 (12)	Monte Attell	KO	18 (25)	Jun 19, 1909	Coffroth's Arena, Colma, California, U.S.	For world bantamweight title claim
52	Draw	25–10–4 (12)	Bert O'Donnell	NWS	6	May 14, 1909	Luzerne Theater, Wilkes-Barre, Pennsylvania, U.S.	
51	Win	25–10–4 (12)	Young Britt	DQ	11 (15)	May 4, 1909	Monumental Theater, Baltimore, Maryland, U.S.	
50	Loss	24–10–4 (12)	Owen Moran	NWS	12	Apr 26, 1909	Anchor A.C., New Haven, Connecticut, U.S.	
49	Loss	24–10–4 (11)	Abe Attell	NWS	10	Mar 23, 1909	Bedford A.C., Brooklyn, New York City, New York, U.S.	
48	Loss	24–10–4 (10)	Kid Beebe	NWS	10	Mar 1, 1909	American A.C., Schenectady, New York, U.S.	
47	Loss	24–10–4 (9)	Boyo Driscoll	NWS	10	Feb 18, 1909	Fairmont A.C., Bronx, New York City, New York, U.S.	
46	Loss	24–10–4 (8)	Owen Moran	PTS	12	Dec 14, 1908	Armory A.A., Boston, Massachusetts, U.S.	
45	Loss	24–9–4 (8)	Joe Wagner	NWS	6	Oct 19, 1908	Roman A.C., New York City, New York, U.S.	
44	Draw	24–9–4 (7)	Joe Wagner	NWS	6	Oct 3, 1908	Old City Hall, Pittsburgh, Pennsylvania, U.S.	
43	Loss	24–9–4 (6)	Frankie Moore	NWS	6	Oct 2, 1908	State A.C., Philadelphia, Pennsylvania, U.S.	
42	Loss	24–9–4 (5)	Tommy O'Toole	NWS	6	Sep 19, 1908	National A.C., Philadelphia, Pennsylvania, U.S.	
41	Win	24–9–4 (4)	Jack Langdon	KO	5 (6)	Sep 5, 1908	National A.C., Philadelphia, Pennsylvania, U.S.	
40	Win	23–9–4 (4)	Freddie O'Brien	NWS	6	Aug 13, 1908	Long Acre A.C., New York City, New York, U.S.	
39	Loss	23–9–4 (3)	Ad Wolgast	PTS	10	May 6, 1908	Green Valley A.C., Milwaukee, Wisconsin, U.S.	
38	Loss	23–8–4 (3)	Abe Attell	TKO	13 (20)	Jan 31, 1908	Dreamland Rink, San Francisco, California, U.S.	For world featherweight title
37	Loss	23–7–4 (3)	Owen Moran	TKO	16 (20)	Nov 22, 1907	Dreamland Rink, San Francisco, California, U.S.	
36	Loss	23–6–4 (3)	Harry Baker	PTS	20	Aug 7, 1906	Naud Junction Pavilion, Los Angeles, California, U.S.	
35	Win	23–5–4 (3)	Kid Long	TKO	2 (4)	Jul 27, 1906	Naud Junction Pavilion, Los Angeles, California, U.S.	
34	Loss	22–5–4 (3)	Abe Attell	PTS	20	Jul 4, 1906	Naud Junction Pavilion, Los Angeles, California, U.S.	For world featherweight title
33	Win	22–4–4 (3)	Harry Tenny	KO	14 (20)	Feb 28, 1906	Mechanic's Pavilion, San Francisco, California, U.S.	Tenny died the following day from injuries suffered during this bout
32	Win	21–4–4 (3)	Harry Tenny	PTS	25	Jul 28, 1905	Colma Club, Colma, California, U.S.	Won vacant American bantamweight title
31	Win	20–4–4 (3)	Dick Hyland	KO	15 (20)	Jan 31, 1905	Woodward's Pavilion, San Francisco, California, U.S.	
30	Loss	19–4–4 (3)	Joe Bowker	PTS	20	Oct 17, 1904	National Sporting Club, Covent Garden, London, England	Lost world bantamweight title
29	Loss	19–3–4 (3)	Harlem Tommy Murphy	NWS	6	Aug 31, 1904	National A.C., Philadelphia, Pennsylvania, U.S.	
28	Win	19–3–4 (2)	Hughey McGovern	NWS	6	Jul 27, 1904	National A.C., Philadelphia, Pennsylvania, U.S.	
27	Win	19–3–4 (1)	Harry Forbes	KO	3 (6)	Jun 17, 1904	Waverly A.C., Chicago, Illinois, U.S.	
26	Win	18–3–4 (1)	Tommy Moore	KO	1 (6)	May 27, 1904	Battery D Armory, Chicago, Illinois, U.S.	
25	Draw	17–3–4 (1)	Johnny Reagan	PTS	20	Oct 16, 1903	Hazard's Pavilion, Los Angeles, California, U.S.	Retained world bantamweight title
24	Win	17–3–3 (1)	Billy DeCoursey	TKO	15 (20)	Sep 4, 1903	Hazard's Pavilion, Los Angeles, California, U.S.	
23	Win	16–3–3 (1)	Harry Forbes	KO	2 (20)	Aug 13, 1903	Mechanic's Pavilion, San Francisco, California, U.S.	Won world bantamweight title
22	Win	15–3–3 (1)	Clarence Forbes	KO	6 (20)	Jan 15, 1903	Mechanic's Pavilion, San Francisco, California, U.S.	
21	Loss	14–3–3 (1)	Harry Forbes	TKO	7 (15)	Dec 23, 1901	Reliance A.C., Oakland, California, U.S.	For world bantamweight title Referee Smith disallowed claims of a foul
20	Draw	14–2–3 (1)	Eddie Hanlon	PTS	15	Apr 11, 1901	Old Exhibition Building, Oakland, California, U.S.	Retained Pacific Coast bantamweight title
19	Win	14–2–2 (1)	Robbie Johnson	KO	2 (4)	Mar 12, 1901	Mechanics' Pavilion Annex, California, U.S.	Won vacant Pacific Coast bantamweight title
18	Loss	13–2–2 (1)	Eddie Hanlon	PTS	4	Jul 31, 1901	Mechanic's Pavilion, San Francisco, California, U.S.	For vacant Pacific Coast bantamweight title
17	Win	13–1–2 (1)	Tommy Dixon	KO	1 (4)	Jun 20, 1901	Mechanics' Pavilion Annex, San Francisco, California, U.S.	
16	Win	12–1–2 (1)	Harry McLaughlin	KO	2 (4)	Jun 6, 1901	Mechanics' Pavilion Annex, San Francisco, California, U.S.	
15	Win	11–1–2 (1)	Harry Baker	KO	1 (4)	May 27, 1901	Mechanic's Pavilion, San Francisco, California, U.S.	
14	Win	10–1–2 (1)	George Margarini	TKO	3 (10)	May 3, 1901	Mechanics' Pavilion Annex, San Francisco, California, U.S.	
13	NC	9–1–2 (1)	Dave Gilmore	NC	1 (4)	Apr 18, 1901	Mechanic's Pavilion, San Francisco, California, U.S.	Police intervened
12	Win	9–1–2	George White	KO	1 (4)	Mar 15, 1901	Bay City A.C., San Francisco, California, U.S.	
11	Win	8–1–2	George Doherty	TKO	4	Feb 20, 1901	Bay City A.C., San Francisco, California, U.S.	
10	Draw	7–1–2	George White	PTS	4	Jan 23, 1901	Bay City A.C., San Francisco, California, U.S.	
9	Draw	7–1–1	George White	PTS	4	Jan 10, 1901	California, U.S.	
8	Win	7–1	Kid Goldie	KO	2 (4)	Dec 28, 1900	West Oakland Club, Oakland, California, U.S.	
7	Win	6–1	Kid Malone	TKO	1 (4)	Dec 26, 1900	Bay City A.C., San Francisco, California, U.S.	
6	Win	5–1	Kid Goldie	KO	2 (4)	Dec 17, 1900	Bay City A.C., San Francisco, California, U.S.	
5	Loss	4–1	Eddie Hanlon	PTS	5	Dec 12, 1900	Washington Hall, San Francisco, California, U.S.	
4	Win	4–0	Ivy Powell	TKO	2 (4)	Dec 7, 1900	Woodward's Pavilion, San Francisco, California, U.S.	
3	Win	3–0	George Gibb	KO	2 (4)	Dec 5, 1900	Bay City A.C., San Francisco, California, U.S.	
2	Win	2–0	John Scott	KO	1 (4)	Nov 19, 1900	Bay City A.C., San Francisco, California, U.S.	
1	Win	1–0	Charles Anderson	KO	1 (4)	Nov 8, 1900	Palo Alto Hall, San Francisco, California, U.S.	

== See also ==
- List of bantamweight boxing champions

Achievements
Preceded by Harry Forbes	World Bantamweight Champion; August 13, 1903 – October 17, 1904	Succeeded by Joe Bowker
