= Charley Goldman =

Polish-American boxing trainer

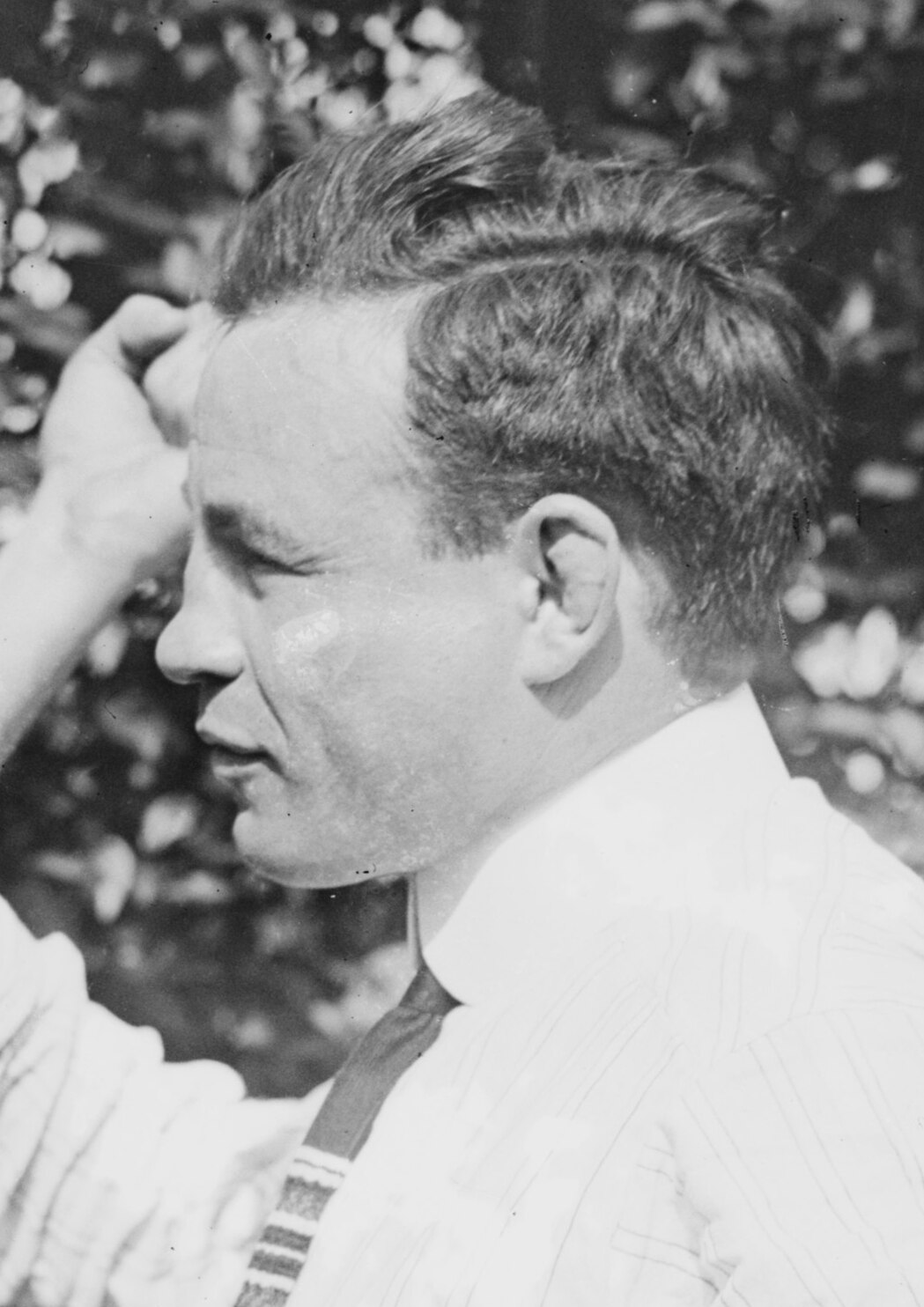
Charlie Goldman, 1910.

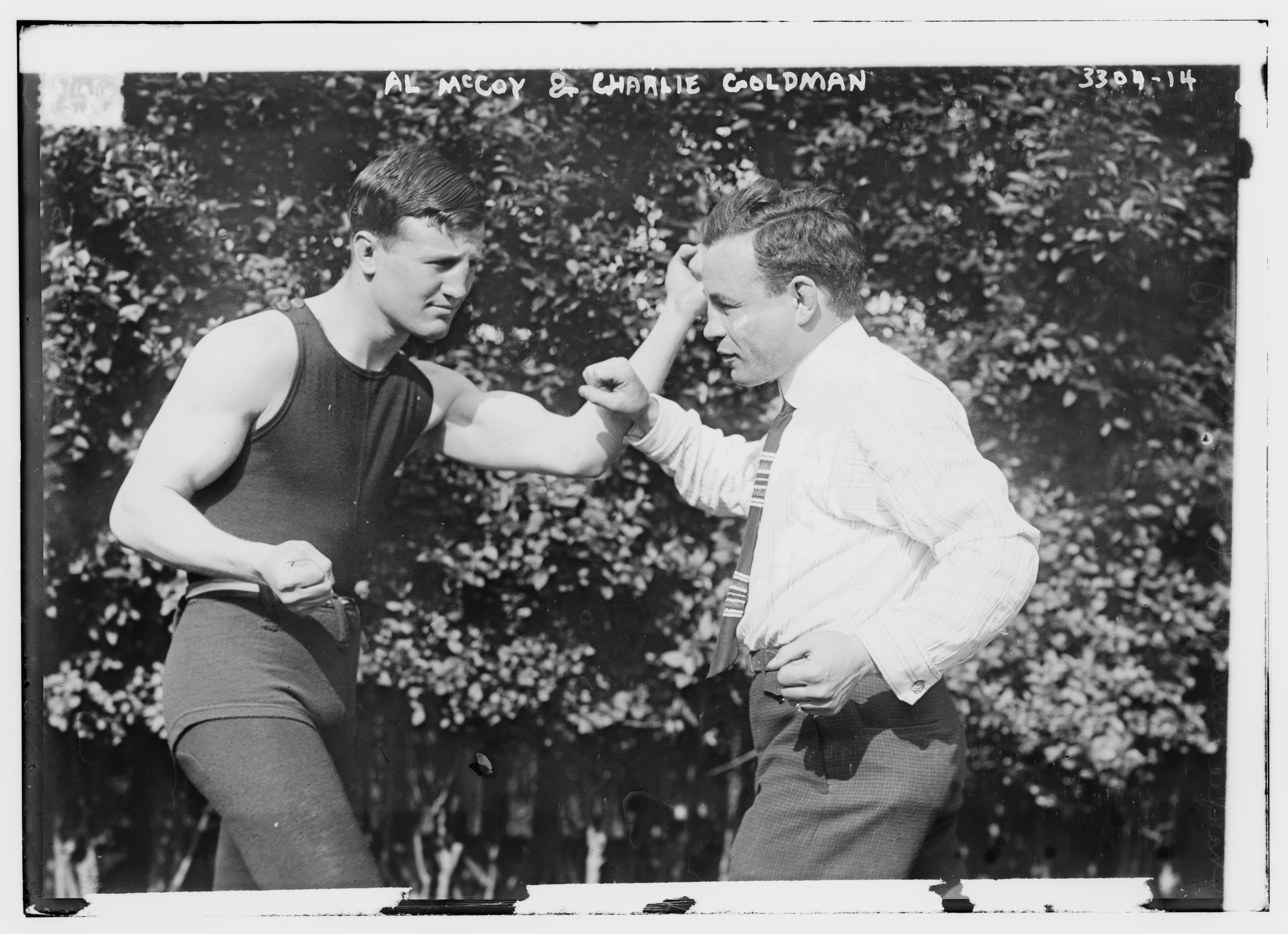
Goldman, with Al McCoy.

Charley Goldman (December 22, 1887, in Warsaw, Poland – November 11, 1968) was a famed boxing trainer who trained five world champions. Goldman's most famous pupil was the undefeated heavyweight champion of the world Rocky Marciano.

== Career as a boxer ==
Goldman, who was Jewish, grew up in the Red Hook section of the borough Brooklyn of New York City. The area was then known as a tough neighborhood, and Goldman learned how to use his fists at an early age to protect his older brother Sam. It is therefore not surprising that Goldman became a professional boxer, as a bantamweight. He was a protégé of world champion "Terrible" Terry McGovern, and claimed to have adopted the habit of wearing a derby hat from McGovern. He fought his first professional fight, at the age of 16, in a Brooklyn, New York saloon.

Goldman claimed to have engaged in over 400 bouts, but most were unrecorded. Given the quasi-legal status of the sport in New York at the time, it was not unusual that no record was kept of any particular encounter. He is attributed with having engaged in 137 recorded fights, of which he won 36 (20 by KO) and losing 6. The other fights were ruled either a No Decision or draw. Included in his No Decision fights was a ten-round attempt to wrest the bantamweight crown from champion Johnny Coulon in November 1912.

Unlike today, ring rivals fought each other repeatedly and often. For example, Goldman had a rivalry with Whitey Kitson. The two were reputed to have fought each other 60 times. Goldman claimed to have fought Whitey twice on the same day, and 12 times in 12 days.

Although, Goldman was considered a top notch fighter he was afflicted with brittle hands, which affected his ability as a puncher. During his career he broke his hands countless times, and was left with deformed, gnarled knuckles and fingers.

== Career as a trainer ==
After his career as a boxer ended, Goldman began training boxers. His first champion was a middleweight Al McCoy. Eventually, Goldman teamed with boxing manager Al Weill, and trained his fighters including world lightweight champion Lou Ambers and featherweight champion Joey Archibald.

It was his work with Marciano, however, that Goldman is most famous for. When Goldman first met Marciano, the fighter was an inexperienced, short (approx. 5'11), stoop shouldered, balding, clumsy heavyweight, with inordinately short arms (Marciano's reach was the shortest of any heavyweight champion at 69 inches). In addition, Marciano was starting late in the professional ranks, and was light for a heavyweight.

Nevertheless, Goldman began to work with Marciano. Goldman believed that a trainer should not interfere with a fighter's natural style, but rather refine and improve it. Accordingly, he did not try to turn him into a slick jabbing boxer. He also sought to turn Marciano's shortcomings into advantages. His adage was: "If you got a tall fighter, make him taller. If you got a short fighter make him shorter." With Marciano, Goldman made him shorter by teaching him to fight out of a crouch. By having him stoop low Goldman made the already low target offered by Marciano that much harder to hit.

He also worked with Marciano to shorten his punches and narrow his stance. Goldman tied Marciano's ankles together with a string to help him to narrow his stance. He taught him to throw combinations, rather than one big bomb at a time. Although the finished product was still crude and clumsy, compared to the style of many boxers, Marciano became a formidable offensive and defensive fighter. But, as Goldman pointed out: "A lot of people say Rocky don't look too good in there, but the guy on the ground don't look too good either."

A visual examination of Marciano's defense could be deceiving. Boxing master, Archie Moore noted that his study of Marciano on film led him to believe that he would be vulnerable to a left hook. When the fight began, Archie learned that, due to the angle of Marciano's defensive crouch, he could hit Marciano with a hook only if he placed himself in position to be hit by Marciano.

The following is a biographical statement about the boxer Marciano and his development through training by experts on boxers and their biographers. Although the qualities that made him physically fit for winning the title were inherent, Charley Goldman was able to improve them.

== Legacy ==
After Marciano retired, Goldman continued to train fighters. Although he briefly worked with Argentinian Oscar Bonavena in his early career, he never again trained a world championship contender.

Goldman was popular with the sportswriters of his day. He was always good for a quote, and continued to sport his derby hat long past the era when they were customarily worn. The derby, along with his diminutive size (5'1" tall), always smoking a cigar and horn rimmed glasses, presented an image that endeared him to the boxing public of his day.

The charecter of Mickey Goldmill is susposely somewhat based on Charley Goldman.
