= Dave Sullivan (boxer) =

Irish boxer (1877–1929)

Personal information
- Nationality: American
- Born: May 9, 1877 Knocknanav, County Cork, Ireland, U.K.
- Died: 1929 New York, U.S.
- Height: 5 ft 4.5 in (1.64 m)
- Weight: Featherweight

Boxing career
- Stance: Orthodox

Boxing record
- Total fights: 58
- Wins: 29
- Win by KO: 18
- Losses: 12
- Draws: 17
- No contests: 1

Dave Sullivan (May 9, 1877 – 1929) was an Irish-American boxer who took the World Featherweight Title on September 26, 1898 in a controversial bout against Solly Smith, in Brooklyn, New York on a fifth-round technical knockout, three rounds after Smith had broken his arm. He would hold the title only forty-six days before losing it to the legendary Black champion George Dixon. Dan Donelly was a corner man and may have acted as his trainer.

== Early life and career ==
Dave Sullivan was born in Knocknanaff, County Cork, Ireland on May 10, 1877. His brother "Spike", accomplished as a lightweight, was also a successful boxer, and his brother Jack sometimes acted as one of his corner men. Like many Irish immigrants, he ended up in Boston, where he began boxing around 1894.

One of his first professional fights was a second-round knockout against Barty McGriel on July 27, 1895 in Boston. Sullivan fought New London featherweight Austin Rice a total of four times, with the first bout coming on September 15, 1896, in a ten-round draw in Queens, New York. Sullivan was actually knocked down twice in their September 15 bout was back on his feet very quickly. He had traveled from Boston for the bout to substitute for another boxer. Rice was eight pounds heavier, in addition to having a slight advantage in height.

On February 17, 1897, he knocked out Patsy Haley in front of a crowd of 2000, in the thirteenth round, at the New Polo Athletic Club in New York City. Haley would become one of New York's most important referees in the 1920s and 1930s, judging many world competitions. Describing the exciting bout with Sullivan, the Saint Paul Globe wrote "Haley at one time looked like a sure winner, but it was only for a brief interval as Sullivan fought like a bull and was a glutton for punishment." Haley was knocked down twice in the thirteenth round, being counted out when he went down for the second time near his corner. Two months later at the Polo Club, on April 28, he would knock out Haley again in the twenty-second round.

=== Losing to British bantamweight champion Pedlar Palmer ===
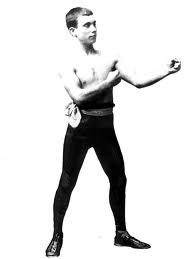
Pedlar Palmer

On the strength of his showing against leading contenders, Sullivan met British boxer Pedlar Palmer in London on October 18, 1897 in what was billed as a World 116 pound Title Match, a World Bantamweight Championship. The purse was $3,500. It would become his first loss according to most sources. Palmer was reported to have injured his hands in the eleventh round, with his right being particularly affected. He failed to receive the twenty round points decision, but established himself as the primary contender for the World Featherweight Title.

On March 4, 1898, he fought Patsy Broderick in what was billed as the 118 pound American title at the Waverly Athletic club in Yonkers, New York, before an impressive crowd of 2000, winning by technical knockout in the ninth round. In a fairly well publicized bout Broderick was said to have grown too groggy to continue in the ninth round. His opponent made his strongest play in the fifth round using a series of left jabs. According to one source, by the ninth Broderick was "almost out" when a police Captain jumped into the ring and the referee gave the decision to Sullivan.

On May 16, 1898, he defeated Sam Kelly in a twenty-round points decision by referee Jimmy Dime in front of a crowd of around three to four thousand at the Lenox Club in New York. One source wrote the fight might have been ruled a draw, except for Kelly grabbing the arms of Sullivan in the final rounds. Dan Donnelly was in Sullivan's corner, but his corner men had not prevented him from being over the agreed upon weight for the bout.

== Taking the World Featherweight Title from Solly Smith ==
Sullivan took the World Featherweight Title against Solly Smith in a fifth-round technical knockout in Brooklyn, New York on September 26, 1898. Smith had the misfortune to break his left arm near the wrist in the second round, ending his chances to give a good showing in the match, and he was compelled to retire in the fifth. Sullivan was said to have a consistent lead in the first four rounds, Smith unable to use his left at all in the fourth and fifth rounds. Smith did not fight again for four months after the injury, when he was defeated by Oscar Gardner.

== Losing the World Featherweight Title two months later ==
Less than two months later on November 11, 1898, he decisively lost the title to Black Canadian boxer George Dixon in a tenth round disqualification at New York City's Lenox Club. Dan Donnelly was in his corner. Sullivan had held the title only forty-six days. At the time of the fight the betting favored Dixon, but was close, and briefly went to even odds. For nine rounds in front of eight thousand spectators, Dixon had the advantage. In the final round, Sullivan's brother Jack walked into the ring twice to speak to Jimmy Coville the referee about the time remaining in the round, eventually causing Coville to end the fight, in frustration over Jack's infraction. Sullivan could have fought on, though he would have almost certainly lost the fight.

== Boxing after loss of the Featherweight Title ==
Beginning a slight decline, he was knocked out in the seventeenth round by Oscar Gardner on January 9, 1899 at New York's Lenox Athletic Club. Gardner was the aggressor throughout the fight before the knockout came in the seventeenth. Gardner was a very worthy opponent, and Sullivan had never been counted out for a fight before this match. The bout was a significant milestone in his career, for as many as 6000 attended the bout, which was described as "ending disastrously" for Sullivan. After a clinch in the last round, both boxers' legs became entangled and Sullivan fell to the floor. On rising, Gardner landed three solid blows to Sullivan's head, the last a wild left jab to the mouth that resulted in the knockout.

=== Boxing Joe Bernstein and Kid Broad ===
On March 27, 1899, he would fight a twenty-five round draw with New York Jewish boxerJoe Bernstein, a three time contender for the World Featherweight Title. Bernstein was a favorite of many fans from New York's Lower East side. The bout took place at the Greenwood Athletic Club in New York, and the two would fight two more twenty-five round draws in New York at the Broadway Athletic Club. Of their October 1, 1899 New York match, the fighting was fierce and even, and only a draw decision would be considered fair. Of their November 10, 1899 bout in Brooklyn, though a close fight, one source wrote "Sullivan outfought Bernstein. He led, forced, and landed, while the other man blocked and remained on the defensive during the majority of the rounds."

After his defeat by Gardner, his best known, closest matched, and most frequent opponent would be Kid Broad, who he first met on November 28, 1899, losing in a twenty-round points decision in Brooklyn, New York. Broad would contend for the World Featherweight Title unsuccessfully on several occasions, and would fight Sullivan five more times in well attended matches.

On October 8, 1900, in an important late career win, he defeated Oscar Gardner in a fourteenth-round technical knockout in Louisville, Kentucky, though Gardner claimed a foul.

On November 30, 1900, persistent fouls caused him to lose his bout with Ole Olson in Chicago at the Illinois Athletic Club. Sullivan was choking and elbowing in clinches, despite the constant warning of the referee to stop. Finally in the third round, Referee Siler stopped the fight due to persistent fouls by Sullivan.

=== Losing to the legendary Terry McGovern ===
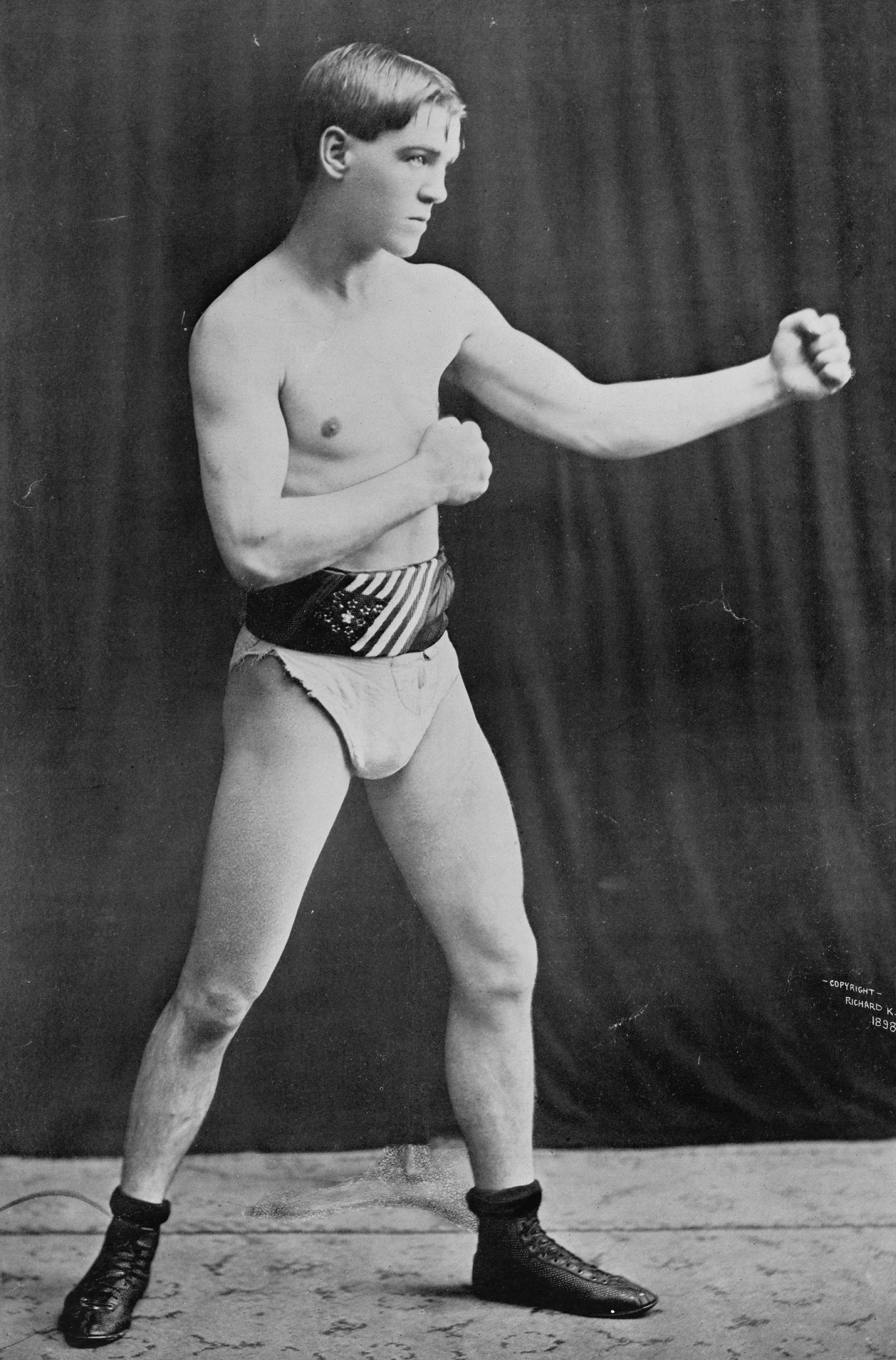
Terry McGovern

On February 22, 1902, after a three-month rest, he would lose to Terry McGovern, perhaps America's best known and most revered featherweight, in a fifteenth-round technical knockout in Louisville, Kentucky. For the first ten rounds the fighting was close. It was described by one reporter as "one of the most terrific and dogged battles ever seen in the roped arena." Sullivan was down in the eleventh round, and tired in round twelve, making a late rally in the fourteenth. He was down in the fifteenth, and took a count before the bout ended. Sullivan was at his best in the fourth round, Though the fighting was fairly close, one reporter noted that McGovern was the aggressor in most rounds, with Sullivan mounting an effective defense. In the fifteenth, Sullivan went down from a storm of rights and lefts from McGovern.

On October 17, 1902, he prevented an armed man and two accomplices from robbing him in New York, using a few swift well placed blows. On the arrival of two policemen, Sullivan recommended his assailants be allowed to go and the police let them.

On November 7, 1902, he defeated Jimmy Briggs on an eighth round foul, at the Criterion Athletic Club in Boston. In the eighth, a blow to the stomach, had Sullivan crying foul to the referee who agreed and called the fight. Prior to the eighth, Briggs had the better of the match, forcing Sullivan to clinch often. After the foul ended the fight, Sullivan looked as though he would rush Briggs and begin a more personal scuffle, though order was maintained.

=== Losing to Young Corbett II ===
On February 29, 1904, in an important match, he lost to World Featherweight claimant Young Corbett II, in an eleventh-round TKO at the Mechanic's Pavilion in San Francisco. At the time he was managed by Tom Sharkey. At least one source noted that Sullivan lost the match badly, describing him as "going to the floor again and again beneath under the hailstorm of blows that reached him from all sides." Considering the fight one sided, one reporter wrote, "At no period of the battle was the issue in doubt, although in some of the earlier rounds Sullivan rallied fiercely and appeared for a few moments to be holding his own." The fight was described as "seven rounds of slaughter." Summing up the outcome of the match, one reporter wrote, "Corbett left the ring without a mark, while on the other hand, Sullivan received a terrific beating."

One of is last fights was with Mississippi at the Consolidated Athletic Club in New York in a winning three round newspaper decision. Mississippi's boxing had been on a considerable downhill slide, however.

== Life after boxing ==
He would quit the ring in 1905, and for a while make a living as a referee at boxing clubs in the New York area. He died in 1929.

Achievements
Preceded by Solly Smith	World Featherweight Champion; September 26, 1898 – November 11, 1898	Succeeded by George Dixon
