= Young Corbett II =

American boxer (1880–1927)

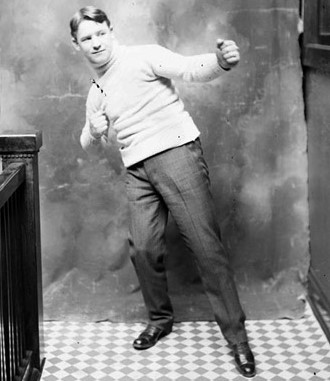

Personal information
- Born: William H. Rothwell; October 4, 1880 Denver, Colorado, U.S.
- Died: April 10, 1927 (aged 46) Denver, Colorado, U.S.
- Weight: Featherweight

Boxing career
- Stance: Orthodox

Boxing record
- Total fights: 111
- Wins: 68
- Win by KO: 48
- Losses: 22
- Draws: 19
- No contests: 2

Young Corbett II (October 4, 1880 – April 10, 1927; born William H. Rothwell) was an American boxer who held the World Featherweight championship. He took the name "Young Corbett II" in honor of James J. Corbett, a heavyweight champion. Corbett was posthumously inducted into the Ring Magazine Hall of Fame in 1965 and the International Boxing Hall of Fame in 2010.

== Pro career ==
=== World featherweight champion ===
Corbett became a professional boxer in 1896 and was undefeated in his first 13 fights with a record of 9-0-3-1. In 1901, Corbett defeated George Dixon for the Western featherweight title in Denver, Colorado. In his next fight, Corbett faced world featherweight champion Terry McGovern in Hartford, Connecticut. Corbett knocked out McGovern in the second round and took the title. He defended the title four times, including a rematch against McGovern, which Corbett also won by knockout. During this time he also engaged in a number of non-title matches, including one against Young Erne and two against Jimmy Briggs, both of which Corbett won.

Attempts to match British World Featherweight Champion Ben Jordan with Young Corbett were not successful.

During this time there is some dispute as to Corbett's claim on the featherweight title. Corbett had trouble making the featherweight limit of 126 pounds, and some sources claim he relinquished his title and moved to the lightweight division in December 1902. Abe Attell then claimed the featherweight title. Other sources show that Corbett defended his featherweight title at weights above 126 pounds with Attell defending the title at 126 pounds.

=== Later career ===
Regardless, Corbett continued to fight. He met future world champion Battling Nelson in two consecutive fights in 1904 and 1905, losing both by technical knockout. He then met old nemesis Young Erne in two more fights in Philadelphia, Pennsylvania. The first fight they fought to a draw. The second fight Corbett lost by decision.

He had a mixed record over the five years remaining in his career. Aurelio Herrera knocked him out in 1906, Harlem Tommy Murphy defeated him via decision, but he defeated Young Erne by decision in 1907. His last professional fight was in 1910, though he fought exhibition matches up until his death in 1927.

Corbett died suddenly in April 1927, dropping dead outside the State Theatre in Denver. His death was attributed to heart disease as he had complained of chest pains to his friends in the week prior to his death.

== Professional boxing record ==
All information in this section is derived from BoxRec, unless otherwise stated.

=== Official record ===
111 fights	59 wins	13 losses
By knockout	48	10
By decision	11	3
Draws	12	
No contests	2	
Newspaper decisions/draws	25	

All newspaper decisions are officially regarded as "no decision" bouts and are not counted in the win/loss/draw column.

No.	Result	Record	Opponent	Type	Round	Date	Location	Notes
111	Loss	59–13–12 (27)	Willie Beecher	TKO	4 (10)	Oct 20, 1909	Long Acre A.C., New York City, New York, U.S.	
110	Loss	59–12–12 (27)	Dave Deshler	KO	5 (12)	Oct 5, 1909	Armory A.A., Boston, Massachusetts, U.S.	
109	Win	59–11–12 (27)	Muggsy Schoel	KO	15 (20)	Aug 20, 1909	Turner Hall, Cheyenne, Wyoming, U.S.	
108	Loss	58–11–12 (27)	Johnny Frayne	TKO	8 (25)	Jul 17, 1909	Coffroth Arena, Colma, California, U.S.	
107	Win	58–10–12 (27)	Mike Fleming	NWS	6	Jun 8, 1909	Douglas A.C., Philadelphia, Pennsylvania, U.S.	
106	Loss	58–10–12 (26)	Sammy Smith	NWS	10	Jun 4, 1909	Fairmont A.C., New York City, New York, U.S.	
105	Loss	58–10–12 (25)	Dick Nelson	NWS	10	May 17, 1909	American A.C., Schenectady, New York, U.S.	
104	Win	58–10–12 (24)	Harry Scroggs	PTS	15	May 11, 1909	Monumental Theatre, Baltimore, Maryland, U.S.	
103	Win	57–10–12 (24)	Bert Keyes	NWS	10	Apr 23, 1909	Fairmont A.C., New York City, New York, U.S.	
102	Draw	57–10–12 (23)	Bert Keyes	NWS	10	Mar 25, 1909	Whirlwind A.C., New York City, New York, U.S.	
101	Win	57–10–12 (22)	Cy Smith	NWS	10	Mar 9, 1909	Schenectady, New York, U.S.	
100	Draw	57–10–12 (21)	Johnny Marto	NWS	10	Mar 2, 1909	Fairmont A.C., New York City, New York, U.S.	
99	Win	57–10–12 (20)	Bobby Wilson	NWS	10	Feb 15, 1909	American A.A., Schenectady, New York, U.S.	
98	Loss	57–10–12 (19)	Mull Bowser	NWS	6	Feb 9, 1909	Waldemeier Hall, Pittsburgh, Pennsylvania, U.S.	
97	Win	57–10–12 (18)	Harry Ferns	KO	11 (20)	Jan 24, 1909	West Side A.C., Gretna, Louisiana, U.S.	
96	Draw	56–10–12 (18)	Phil Brock	PTS	10	Dec 12, 1908	Southern A.C., New Orleans, Louisiana, U.S.	
95	Loss	56–10–11 (18)	Kid Sullivan	KO	11 (15)	May 3, 1907	Germania Maennerchor Hall, Baltimore, Maryland, U.S.	
94	Loss	56–9–11 (18)	Young Erne	NWS	6	Apr 27, 1907	National A.C., Philadelphia, Pennsylvania, U.S.	
93	Loss	56–9–11 (17)	Harlem Tommy Murphy	NWS	6	Jan 9, 1907	National A.C., Philadelphia, Pennsylvania, U.S.	
92	Draw	56–9–11 (16)	Terry McGovern	NWS	6	Oct 17, 1906	National A.C., Philadelphia, Pennsylvania, U.S.	
91	Draw	56–9–11 (15)	Eddie Johnson	NWS	6	May 29, 1906	Mobile A.C., New York City, New York, U.S.	
90	Win	56–9–11 (14)	Dick Hyland	TKO	5 (20)	Apr 30, 1906	Opera House, Ogden, Utah, U.S.	
89	Loss	55–9–11 (14)	Aurelio Herrera	KO	5 (10)	Jan 12, 1906	Pacific A.C., Los Angeles, California, U.S.	
88	Loss	55–8–11 (14)	Charley Sieger	NWS	3	Nov 30, 1905	Hudson A.C., New York City, New York, U.S.	
87	Win	55–8–11 (13)	Charley Sieger	KO	3 (?)	Nov 18, 1905	Manhattan, New York City, New York, U.S.	
86	Loss	54–8–11 (13)	Unk Russell	NWS	6	Nov 4, 1905	National A.C., Philadelphia, Pennsylvania, U.S.	
85	Draw	54–8–11 (12)	Kid Goodman	PTS	15	Oct 31, 1905	Douglas A.C., Chelsea, Massachusetts, U.S.	
84	Win	54–8–10 (12)	Joe Tipman	RTD	8 (15)	Oct 27, 1905	Germania Maennerchor Hall, Baltimore, Maryland, U.S.	
83	Loss	53–8–10 (12)	Young Erne	NWS	6	Oct 25, 1905	Washington S.C., Philadelphia, Pennsylvania, U.S.	
82	Win	53–8–10 (11)	Maurice Thompson	TKO	10 (20)	Jun 13, 1905	Broadway Theater, Butte, Montana, U.S.	
81	Loss	52–8–10 (11)	Eddie Hanlon	PTS	20	Jun 2, 1905	Woodward's Pavilion, San Francisco, California, U.S.	
80	Draw	52–7–10 (11)	Young Erne	NWS	6	Apr 3, 1905	Washington S.C., Philadelphia, Pennsylvania, U.S.	
79	Draw	52–7–10 (10)	Kid Sullivan	PTS	10	Mar 31, 1905	Fourth Regiment Armory, Baltimore, Maryland, U.S.	
78	Loss	52–7–9 (10)	Battling Nelson	TKO	9 (20)	Feb 28, 1905	Woodward's Pavilion, San Francisco, California, U.S.	
77	Loss	52–6–9 (10)	Battling Nelson	TKO	10 (20)	Nov 29, 1904	Woodward's Pavilion, San Francisco, California, U.S.	
76	Win	52–5–9 (10)	Frank George	KO	3 (?)	Nov 26, 1904	San Francisco, California, U.S.	
75	Win	51–5–9 (10)	Tommy Mowatt	PTS	6	Apr 2, 1904	Waverly A.C., Chicago, Illinois, U.S.	
74	Loss	50–5–9 (10)	Jimmy Britt	PTS	20	Mar 25, 1904	Woodward's Pavilion, San Francisco, California, U.S.	Lost world featherweight title; At 130lbs
73	Win	50–4–9 (10)	Dave Sullivan	TKO	11 (20)	Feb 29, 1904	Mechanic's Pavilion, San Francisco, California, U.S.	Retained world featherweight title; At 130lbs
72	Win	49–4–9 (10)	Eddie Hanlon	TKO	16 (20)	Dec 29, 1903	Mechanic's Pavilion, San Francisco, California, U.S.	Retained world featherweight title; At 130lbs
71	Win	48–4–9 (10)	Hugh Murphy	KO	11 (15)	Oct 27, 1903	Criterion A.C., Boston, Massachusetts, U.S.	
70	Draw	47–4–9 (10)	Tim Callahan	NWS	6	Oct 21, 1903	National A.C., Philadelphia, Pennsylvania, U.S.	
69	Win	47–4–9 (9)	Kid Stein	NWS	6	Oct 10, 1903	National A.C., Philadelphia, Pennsylvania, U.S.	
68	Win	47–4–9 (8)	Jack O'Neil	KO	5 (6)	Jul 29, 1903	National A.C., Philadelphia, Pennsylvania, U.S.	
67	Win	46–4–9 (8)	Billy Maynard	KO	1 (6)	Jul 24, 1903	Industrial Hall, Philadelphia, Pennsylvania, U.S.	
66	Win	45–4–9 (8)	Jimmy Briggs	PTS	10	Jul 22, 1903	Tammany A.C., Boston, Massachusetts, U.S.	
65	Win	44–4–9 (8)	Sammy Smith	NWS	6	Jul 6, 1903	National A.C., Philadelphia, Pennsylvania, U.S.	
64	Win	44–4–9 (7)	Jimmy Briggs	PTS	10	Jun 29, 1903	Criterion A.C., Boston, Massachusetts, U.S.	
63	Win	43–4–9 (7)	Hugh Murphy	KO	6 (12)	Jun 25, 1903	Tammany A.C., Roxbury, Massachusetts, U.S.	
62	Win	42–4–9 (7)	Jack O'Keefe	KO	3 (?)	May 19, 1903	West End A.C., Saint Louis, Missouri, U.S.	
61	Draw	41–4–9 (7)	George Memsic	PTS	4	Apr 23, 1903	Portland, Oregon, U.S.	
60	Win	41–4–8 (7)	Terry McGovern	KO	11 (20)	Mar 31, 1903	Mechanic's Pavilion, San Francisco, California, U.S.	Retained world featherweight title; At 127lbs
59	Draw	40–4–8 (7)	Eddie Hanlon	PTS	20	Feb 26, 1903	Mechanic's Pavilion, San Francisco, California, U.S.	Retained world featherweight title; At 130lbs
58	Draw	40–4–7 (7)	Billy Maynard	NWS	6	Feb 2, 1903	Washington S.C., Philadelphia, Pennsylvania, U.S.	
57	Win	40–4–7 (6)	Austin Rice	TKO	18 (?)	Jan 14, 1903	Whittington Park, Hot Springs, Arkansas, U.S.	Retained world featherweight title; At 130lbs
56	Loss	39–4–7 (6)	Crocky Boyle	NWS	6	Nov 17, 1902	Washington S.C., Philadelphia, Pennsylvania, U.S.	
55	Win	39–4–7 (5)	Young Erne	NWS	6	Oct 27, 1902	Washington S.C., Philadelphia, Pennsylvania, U.S.	
54	Win	39–4–7 (4)	Joe Bernstein	TKO	7 (10)	Oct 16, 1902	Music Hall, Baltimore, Maryland, U.S.	Retained world featherweight title; At 130lbs
53	Win	38–4–7 (4)	Eddie Lenny	NWS	6	Oct 7, 1902	Industrial Hall, Philadelphia, Pennsylvania, U.S.	
52	Win	38–4–7 (3)	Kid Broad	PTS	10	May 23, 1902	Coliseum, Denver, Colorado, U.S.	Retained world featherweight title
51	Win	37–4–7 (3)	Frankie Downey	KO	5 (?)	Jan 1, 1902	Denver, Colorado, U.S.	Exact date unknown
50	Win	36–4–7 (3)	Terry McGovern	KO	2 (?)	Nov 28, 1901	Coliseum, Hartford, Connecticut, U.S.	Won world featherweight title
49	Win	35–4–7 (3)	George Dixon	PTS	10	Aug 16, 1901	Coliseum Hall, Denver, Colorado, U.S.	
48	Win	34–4–7 (3)	Kid Broad	PTS	10	Jul 26, 1901	Coliseum Hall, Denver, Colorado, U.S.	
47	Win	33–4–7 (3)	Oscar Gardner	TKO	6 (10)	Jun 26, 1901	Wheel Club, Denver, Colorado, U.S.	
46	Win	32–4–7 (3)	Eddie Santry	KO	2 (10)	Apr 12, 1901	Colorado A.A., Denver, Colorado, U.S.	
45	Loss	31–4–7 (3)	Kid Broad	KO	4 (?)	Mar 22, 1901	Colorado A.A., Denver, Colorado, U.S.	
44	Draw	31–3–7 (3)	Whitey Watson	PTS	10	Mar 10, 1901	Cripple Creek, Colorado, U.S.	Exact date unknown
43	Win	31–3–6 (3)	Joe Bernstein	TKO	7 (10)	Jan 18, 1901	Colorado A.C., Denver, Colorado, U.S.	
42	Win	30–3–6 (3)	Reddy Coogan	TKO	3 (20)	Dec 14, 1900	Olympic A.C., Cripple Creek, Colorado, U.S.	
41	Win	29–3–6 (3)	Kid Downing	TKO	3 (?)	Dec 7, 1900	Colorado Springs, Colorado, U.S.	
40	Win	28–3–6 (3)	Jim Kid McGuire	KO	2 (?)	Dec 7, 1900	Colorado Springs, Colorado, U.S.	
39	Win	27–3–6 (3)	Reddy Coogan	NWS	10	Nov 29, 1900	Colorado Springs, Colorado, U.S.	
38	Draw	27–3–6 (2)	Benny Yanger	PTS	10	Nov 27, 1900	Colorado A.C., Denver, Colorado, U.S.	
37	Win	27–3–5 (2)	Jimmy Reilly	KO	3 (10)	Oct 23, 1900	Olympic A.C., Denver, Colorado, U.S.	Won vacant Western 128lbs title
36	Win	26–3–5 (2)	Jimmy Coogan	PTS	20	Oct 6, 1900	Pueblo, Colorado, U.S.	
35	Draw	25–3–5 (2)	Jack Kane	PTS	20	Sep 28, 1900	Cripple Creek, Colorado, U.S.	
34	Draw	25–3–4 (2)	Jimmy Reilly	PTS	10	Sep 21, 1900	Colorado A.C., Denver, Colorado, U.S.	
33	Win	25–3–3 (2)	Larry Lacey	KO	1 (?)	Aug 27, 1900	Denver, Colorado, U.S.	
32	Win	24–3–3 (2)	Kid Lee	KO	4 (?)	Jul 28, 1900	Cripple Creek, Colorado, U.S.	
31	Win	23–3–3 (2)	Roy Streeter	KO	2 (?)	Jul 5, 1900	Cripple Creek, Colorado, U.S.	
30	Win	22–3–3 (2)	Frank Newhouse	KO	17 (?)	May 28, 1900	Aspen, Colorado, U.S.	
29	Win	21–3–3 (2)	Jimmy Coogan	PTS	6	May 4, 1900	Colorado A.C., Denver, Colorado, U.S.	
28	Loss	20–3–3 (2)	Benny Yanger	KO	8 (10)	Apr 13, 1900	Colorado A.C., Denver, Colorado, U.S.	
27	Win	20–2–3 (2)	Colorado Jack Dempsey	KO	3 (20)	Feb 26, 1900	Pueblo, Colorado, U.S.	A finish fight
26	Win	19–2–3 (2)	Kid Kelly	TKO	2 (?)	Feb 23, 1900	Colorado A.C., Denver, Colorado, U.S.	
25	Loss	18–2–3 (2)	Colorado Jack Dempsey	KO	2 (?)	Feb 12, 1900	Pueblo, Colorado, U.S.	For vacant Colorado State featherweight title
24	Win	18–1–3 (2)	Fred Fairman	KO	1 (?)	Jan 10, 1900	Denver, Colorado, U.S.	
23	Win	17–1–3 (2)	Kid Bennett	KO	4 (20)	Dec 22, 1899	Grand Opera House, Cripple Creek, Colorado, U.S.	
22	Win	16–1–3 (2)	Ray Lee	KO	6 (6)	Dec 12, 1899	Grand Opera House, Cripple Creek, Colorado, U.S.	
21	Win	15–1–3 (2)	Billy Brown	PTS	4	Oct 6, 1899	Des Moines, Iowa, U.S.	
20	Win	14–1–3 (2)	Al Rivers	KO	4 (?)	Oct 4, 1899	Des Moines, Iowa, U.S.	
19	Win	13–1–3 (2)	Billy Harris	KO	2 (?)	Sep 3, 1899	Omaha, Nebraska, U.S.	
18	Win	12–1–3 (2)	Jack Flint	PTS	6	Sep 1, 1899	Omaha, Nebraska, U.S.	
17	ND	11–1–3 (2)	Eugene Turner	ND	6	Aug 24, 1899	Colorado A.A., Denver, Colorado, U.S.	
16	Win	11–1–3 (1)	Paddy Hughes	KO	1 (?)	Aug 19, 1899	Hastings, Nebraska, U.S.	
15	Win	10–1–3 (1)	Jack Munson	KO	2 (?)	Aug 4, 1899	Colorado A.A., Denver, Colorado, U.S.	
14	Loss	9–1–3 (1)	Billy Rotchford	PTS	20	Jul 24, 1899	Colorado A.A., Denver, Colorado, U.S.	For vacant bantamweight championship of the west
13	Draw	9–0–3 (1)	Colorado Jack Dempsey	PTS	20	Jun 12, 1899	Wheeler Opera House, Aspen, Colorado, U.S.	
12	Win	9–0–2 (1)	Abe Spitz	KO	4 (10)	May 24, 1899	Wheeler Opera House, Aspen, Colorado, U.S.	
11	Win	8–0–2 (1)	Billy Irwin	KO	4 (12)	Apr 17, 1899	Wheeler Opera House, Aspen, Colorado, U.S.	
10	Win	7–0–2 (1)	Tom Glenn	KO	5 (12)	Mar 27, 1899	Opera House, Leadville, Colorado, U.S.	
9	Draw	6–0–2 (1)	Abe Spitz	PTS	20	Feb 7, 1899	Denver A.C., Denver, Colorado, U.S.	
8	Win	6–0–1 (1)	Dago Mike	KO	2 (25)	Dec 16, 1898	Aspen, Colorado, U.S.	
7	Draw	5–0–1 (1)	Fred O'Neil	PTS	20	Nov 14, 1898	Tivoli Theater, Aspen, Colorado, U.S.	
6	Win	5–0 (1)	Fred O'Neil	TKO	4 (4)	Jul 23, 1898	Davenport St. Music Hall, Omaha, Nebraska, U.S.	
5	NC	4–0 (1)	Tom Delaney	NC	4 (4)	Jun 1, 1897	United States of America	Exact date and result unknown
4	Win	4–0	Julius Segil	KO	4 (?)	Mar 3, 1897	United States of America	Exact date and location unknown
3	Win	3–0	Kid Harris	KO	4 (?)	Feb 2, 1897	United States of America	Exact date and location unknown
2	Win	2–0	Bert Crater	KO	3 (?)	Jan 1, 1897	Denver, Colorado, U.S.	Exact date unknown
1	Win	1–0	N. Smith	KO	7 (?)	Apr 19, 1896	Holbrooke Reservoir, La Junta, Colorado, U.S.	

=== Unofficial record ===
111 fights	68 wins	22 losses
By knockout	48	10
By decision	20	12
Draws	19	
No contests	2	

Record with the inclusion of newspaper decisions in the win/loss/draw column.

No.	Result	Record	Opponent	Type	Round	Date	Location	Notes
111	Loss	68–22–19 (2)	Willie Beecher	TKO	4 (10)	Oct 20, 1909	Long Acre A.C., New York City, New York, U.S.	
110	Loss	68–21–19 (2)	Dave Deshler	KO	5 (12)	Oct 5, 1909	Armory A.A., Boston, Massachusetts, U.S.	
109	Win	68–20–19 (2)	Muggsy Schoel	KO	15 (20)	Aug 20, 1909	Turner Hall, Cheyenne, Wyoming, U.S.	
108	Loss	67–20–19 (2)	Johnny Frayne	TKO	8 (25)	Jul 17, 1909	Coffroth Arena, Colma, California, U.S.	
107	Win	67–19–19 (2)	Mike Fleming	NWS	6	Jun 8, 1909	Douglas A.C., Philadelphia, Pennsylvania, U.S.	
106	Loss	66–19–19 (2)	Sammy Smith	NWS	10	Jun 4, 1909	Fairmont A.C., New York City, New York, U.S.	
105	Loss	66–18–19 (2)	Dick Nelson	NWS	10	May 17, 1909	American A.C., Schenectady, New York, U.S.	
104	Win	66–17–19 (2)	Harry Scroggs	PTS	15	May 11, 1909	Monumental Theatre, Baltimore, Maryland, U.S.	
103	Win	65–17–19 (2)	Bert Keyes	NWS	10	Apr 23, 1909	Fairmont A.C., New York City, New York, U.S.	
102	Draw	64–17–19 (2)	Bert Keyes	NWS	10	Mar 25, 1909	Whirlwind A.C., New York City, New York, U.S.	
101	Win	64–17–18 (2)	Cy Smith	NWS	10	Mar 9, 1909	Schenectady, New York, U.S.	
100	Draw	63–17–18 (2)	Johnny Marto	NWS	10	Mar 2, 1909	Fairmont A.C., New York City, New York, U.S.	
99	Win	63–17–17 (2)	Bobby Wilson	NWS	10	Feb 15, 1909	American A.A., Schenectady, New York, U.S.	
98	Loss	62–17–17 (2)	Mull Bowser	NWS	6	Feb 9, 1909	Waldemeier Hall, Pittsburgh, Pennsylvania, U.S.	
97	Win	62–16–17 (2)	Harry Ferns	KO	11 (20)	Jan 24, 1909	West Side A.C., Gretna, Louisiana, U.S.	
96	Draw	61–16–17 (2)	Phil Brock	PTS	10	Dec 12, 1908	Southern A.C., New Orleans, Louisiana, U.S.	
95	Loss	61–16–16 (2)	Kid Sullivan	KO	11 (15)	May 3, 1907	Germania Maennerchor Hall, Baltimore, Maryland, U.S.	
94	Loss	61–15–16 (2)	Young Erne	NWS	6	Apr 27, 1907	National A.C., Philadelphia, Pennsylvania, U.S.	
93	Loss	61–14–16 (2)	Harlem Tommy Murphy	NWS	6	Jan 9, 1907	National A.C., Philadelphia, Pennsylvania, U.S.	
92	Draw	61–13–16 (2)	Terry McGovern	NWS	6	Oct 17, 1906	National A.C., Philadelphia, Pennsylvania, U.S.	
91	Draw	61–13–15 (2)	Eddie Johnson	NWS	6	May 29, 1906	Mobile A.C., New York City, New York, U.S.	
90	Win	61–13–14 (2)	Dick Hyland	TKO	5 (20)	Apr 30, 1906	Opera House, Ogden, Utah, U.S.	
89	Loss	60–13–14 (2)	Aurelio Herrera	KO	5 (10)	Jan 12, 1906	Pacific A.C., Los Angeles, California, U.S.	
88	Loss	60–12–14 (2)	Charley Sieger	NWS	3	Nov 30, 1905	Hudson A.C., New York City, New York, U.S.	
87	Win	60–11–14 (2)	Charley Sieger	KO	3 (?)	Nov 18, 1905	Manhattan, New York City, New York, U.S.	
86	Loss	59–11–14 (2)	Unk Russell	NWS	6	Nov 4, 1905	National A.C., Philadelphia, Pennsylvania, U.S.	
85	Draw	59–10–14 (2)	Kid Goodman	PTS	15	Oct 31, 1905	Douglas A.C., Chelsea, Massachusetts, U.S.	
84	Win	59–10–13 (2)	Joe Tipman	RTD	8 (15)	Oct 27, 1905	Germania Maennerchor Hall, Baltimore, Maryland, U.S.	
83	Loss	58–10–13 (2)	Young Erne	NWS	6	Oct 25, 1905	Washington S.C., Philadelphia, Pennsylvania, U.S.	
82	Win	58–9–13 (2)	Maurice Thompson	TKO	10 (20)	Jun 13, 1905	Broadway Theater, Butte, Montana, U.S.	
81	Loss	57–9–13 (2)	Eddie Hanlon	PTS	20	Jun 2, 1905	Woodward's Pavilion, San Francisco, California, U.S.	
80	Draw	57–8–13 (2)	Young Erne	NWS	6	Apr 3, 1905	Washington S.C., Philadelphia, Pennsylvania, U.S.	
79	Draw	57–8–12 (2)	Kid Sullivan	PTS	10	Mar 31, 1905	Fourth Regiment Armory, Baltimore, Maryland, U.S.	
78	Loss	57–8–11 (2)	Battling Nelson	TKO	9 (20)	Feb 28, 1905	Woodward's Pavilion, San Francisco, California, U.S.	
77	Loss	57–7–11 (2)	Battling Nelson	TKO	10 (20)	Nov 29, 1904	Woodward's Pavilion, San Francisco, California, U.S.	
76	Win	57–6–11 (2)	Frank George	KO	3 (?)	Nov 26, 1904	San Francisco, California, U.S.	
75	Win	56–6–11 (2)	Tommy Mowatt	PTS	6	Apr 2, 1904	Waverly A.C., Chicago, Illinois, U.S.	
74	Loss	55–6–11 (2)	Jimmy Britt	PTS	20	Mar 25, 1904	Woodward's Pavilion, San Francisco, California, U.S.	Lost world featherweight title; At 130lbs
73	Win	55–5–11 (2)	Dave Sullivan	TKO	11 (20)	Feb 29, 1904	Mechanic's Pavilion, San Francisco, California, U.S.	Retained world featherweight title; At 130lbs
72	Win	54–5–11 (2)	Eddie Hanlon	TKO	16 (20)	Dec 29, 1903	Mechanic's Pavilion, San Francisco, California, U.S.	Retained world featherweight title; At 130lbs
71	Win	53–5–11 (2)	Hugh Murphy	KO	11 (15)	Oct 27, 1903	Criterion A.C., Boston, Massachusetts, U.S.	
70	Draw	52–5–11 (2)	Tim Callahan	NWS	6	Oct 21, 1903	National A.C., Philadelphia, Pennsylvania, U.S.	
69	Win	52–5–10 (2)	Kid Stein	NWS	6	Oct 10, 1903	National A.C., Philadelphia, Pennsylvania, U.S.	
68	Win	51–5–10 (2)	Jack O'Neil	KO	5 (6)	Jul 29, 1903	National A.C., Philadelphia, Pennsylvania, U.S.	
67	Win	50–5–10 (2)	Billy Maynard	KO	1 (6)	Jul 24, 1903	Industrial Hall, Philadelphia, Pennsylvania, U.S.	
66	Win	49–5–10 (2)	Jimmy Briggs	PTS	10	Jul 22, 1903	Tammany A.C., Boston, Massachusetts, U.S.	
65	Win	48–5–10 (2)	Sammy Smith	NWS	6	Jul 6, 1903	National A.C., Philadelphia, Pennsylvania, U.S.	
64	Win	47–5–10 (2)	Jimmy Briggs	PTS	10	Jun 29, 1903	Criterion A.C., Boston, Massachusetts, U.S.	
63	Win	46–5–10 (2)	Hugh Murphy	KO	6 (12)	Jun 25, 1903	Tammany A.C., Roxbury, Massachusetts, U.S.	
62	Win	45–5–10 (2)	Jack O'Keefe	KO	3 (?)	May 19, 1903	West End A.C., Saint Louis, Missouri, U.S.	
61	Draw	44–5–10 (2)	George Memsic	PTS	4	Apr 23, 1903	Portland, Oregon, U.S.	
60	Win	44–5–9 (2)	Terry McGovern	KO	11 (20)	Mar 31, 1903	Mechanic's Pavilion, San Francisco, California, U.S.	Retained world featherweight title; At 127lbs
59	Draw	43–5–9 (2)	Eddie Hanlon	PTS	20	Feb 26, 1903	Mechanic's Pavilion, San Francisco, California, U.S.	Retained world featherweight title; At 130lbs
58	Draw	43–5–8 (2)	Billy Maynard	NWS	6	Feb 2, 1903	Washington S.C., Philadelphia, Pennsylvania, U.S.	
57	Win	43–5–7 (2)	Austin Rice	TKO	18 (?)	Jan 14, 1903	Whittington Park, Hot Springs, Arkansas, U.S.	Retained world featherweight title; At 130lbs
56	Loss	42–5–7 (2)	Crocky Boyle	NWS	6	Nov 17, 1902	Washington S.C., Philadelphia, Pennsylvania, U.S.	
55	Win	42–4–7 (2)	Young Erne	NWS	6	Oct 27, 1902	Washington S.C., Philadelphia, Pennsylvania, U.S.	
54	Win	41–4–7 (2)	Joe Bernstein	TKO	7 (10)	Oct 16, 1902	Music Hall, Baltimore, Maryland, U.S.	Retained world featherweight title; At 130lbs
53	Win	40–4–7 (2)	Eddie Lenny	NWS	6	Oct 7, 1902	Industrial Hall, Philadelphia, Pennsylvania, U.S.	
52	Win	39–4–7 (2)	Kid Broad	PTS	10	May 23, 1902	Coliseum, Denver, Colorado, U.S.	Retained world featherweight title
51	Win	38–4–7 (2)	Frankie Downey	KO	5 (?)	Jan 1, 1902	Denver, Colorado, U.S.	Exact date unknown
50	Win	37–4–7 (2)	Terry McGovern	KO	2 (?)	Nov 28, 1901	Coliseum, Hartford, Connecticut, U.S.	Won world featherweight title
49	Win	36–4–7 (2)	George Dixon	PTS	10	Aug 16, 1901	Coliseum Hall, Denver, Colorado, U.S.	
48	Win	35–4–7 (2)	Kid Broad	PTS	10	Jul 26, 1901	Coliseum Hall, Denver, Colorado, U.S.	
47	Win	34–4–7 (2)	Oscar Gardner	TKO	6 (10)	Jun 26, 1901	Wheel Club, Denver, Colorado, U.S.	
46	Win	33–4–7 (2)	Eddie Santry	KO	2 (10)	Apr 12, 1901	Colorado A.A., Denver, Colorado, U.S.	
45	Loss	32–4–7 (2)	Kid Broad	KO	4 (?)	Mar 22, 1901	Colorado A.A., Denver, Colorado, U.S.	
44	Draw	32–3–7 (2)	Whitey Watson	PTS	10	Mar 10, 1901	Cripple Creek, Colorado, U.S.	Exact date unknown
43	Win	32–3–6 (2)	Joe Bernstein	TKO	7 (10)	Jan 18, 1901	Colorado A.C., Denver, Colorado, U.S.	
42	Win	31–3–6 (2)	Reddy Coogan	TKO	3 (20)	Dec 14, 1900	Olympic A.C., Cripple Creek, Colorado, U.S.	
41	Win	30–3–6 (2)	Kid Downing	TKO	3 (?)	Dec 7, 1900	Colorado Springs, Colorado, U.S.	
40	Win	29–3–6 (2)	Jim Kid McGuire	KO	2 (?)	Dec 7, 1900	Colorado Springs, Colorado, U.S.	
39	Win	28–3–6 (2)	Reddy Coogan	NWS	10	Nov 29, 1900	Colorado Springs, Colorado, U.S.	
38	Draw	27–3–6 (2)	Benny Yanger	PTS	10	Nov 27, 1900	Colorado A.C., Denver, Colorado, U.S.	
37	Win	27–3–5 (2)	Jimmy Reilly	KO	3 (10)	Oct 23, 1900	Olympic A.C., Denver, Colorado, U.S.	Won vacant Western 128lbs title
36	Win	26–3–5 (2)	Jimmy Coogan	PTS	20	Oct 6, 1900	Pueblo, Colorado, U.S.	
35	Draw	25–3–5 (2)	Jack Kane	PTS	20	Sep 28, 1900	Cripple Creek, Colorado, U.S.	
34	Draw	25–3–4 (2)	Jimmy Reilly	PTS	10	Sep 21, 1900	Colorado A.C., Denver, Colorado, U.S.	
33	Win	25–3–3 (2)	Larry Lacey	KO	1 (?)	Aug 27, 1900	Denver, Colorado, U.S.	
32	Win	24–3–3 (2)	Kid Lee	KO	4 (?)	Jul 28, 1900	Cripple Creek, Colorado, U.S.	
31	Win	23–3–3 (2)	Roy Streeter	KO	2 (?)	Jul 5, 1900	Cripple Creek, Colorado, U.S.	
30	Win	22–3–3 (2)	Frank Newhouse	KO	17 (?)	May 28, 1900	Aspen, Colorado, U.S.	
29	Win	21–3–3 (2)	Jimmy Coogan	PTS	6	May 4, 1900	Colorado A.C., Denver, Colorado, U.S.	
28	Loss	20–3–3 (2)	Benny Yanger	KO	8 (10)	Apr 13, 1900	Colorado A.C., Denver, Colorado, U.S.	
27	Win	20–2–3 (2)	Colorado Jack Dempsey	KO	3 (20)	Feb 26, 1900	Pueblo, Colorado, U.S.	A finish fight
26	Win	19–2–3 (2)	Kid Kelly	TKO	2 (?)	Feb 23, 1900	Colorado A.C., Denver, Colorado, U.S.	
25	Loss	18–2–3 (2)	Colorado Jack Dempsey	KO	2 (?)	Feb 12, 1900	Pueblo, Colorado, U.S.	For vacant Colorado State featherweight title
24	Win	18–1–3 (2)	Fred Fairman	KO	1 (?)	Jan 10, 1900	Denver, Colorado, U.S.	
23	Win	17–1–3 (2)	Kid Bennett	KO	4 (20)	Dec 22, 1899	Grand Opera House, Cripple Creek, Colorado, U.S.	
22	Win	16–1–3 (2)	Ray Lee	KO	6 (6)	Dec 12, 1899	Grand Opera House, Cripple Creek, Colorado, U.S.	
21	Win	15–1–3 (2)	Billy Brown	PTS	4	Oct 6, 1899	Des Moines, Iowa, U.S.	
20	Win	14–1–3 (2)	Al Rivers	KO	4 (?)	Oct 4, 1899	Des Moines, Iowa, U.S.	
19	Win	13–1–3 (2)	Billy Harris	KO	2 (?)	Sep 3, 1899	Omaha, Nebraska, U.S.	
18	Win	12–1–3 (2)	Jack Flint	PTS	6	Sep 1, 1899	Omaha, Nebraska, U.S.	
17	ND	11–1–3 (2)	Eugene Turner	ND	6	Aug 24, 1899	Colorado A.A., Denver, Colorado, U.S.	
16	Win	11–1–3 (1)	Paddy Hughes	KO	1 (?)	Aug 19, 1899	Hastings, Nebraska, U.S.	
15	Win	10–1–3 (1)	Jack Munson	KO	2 (?)	Aug 4, 1899	Colorado A.A., Denver, Colorado, U.S.	
14	Loss	9–1–3 (1)	Billy Rotchford	PTS	20	Jul 24, 1899	Colorado A.A., Denver, Colorado, U.S.	For vacant bantamweight championship of the west
13	Draw	9–0–3 (1)	Colorado Jack Dempsey	PTS	20	Jun 12, 1899	Wheeler Opera House, Aspen, Colorado, U.S.	
12	Win	9–0–2 (1)	Abe Spitz	KO	4 (10)	May 24, 1899	Wheeler Opera House, Aspen, Colorado, U.S.	
11	Win	8–0–2 (1)	Billy Irwin	KO	4 (12)	Apr 17, 1899	Wheeler Opera House, Aspen, Colorado, U.S.	
10	Win	7–0–2 (1)	Tom Glenn	KO	5 (12)	Mar 27, 1899	Opera House, Leadville, Colorado, U.S.	
9	Draw	6–0–2 (1)	Abe Spitz	PTS	20	Feb 7, 1899	Denver A.C., Denver, Colorado, U.S.	
8	Win	6–0–1 (1)	Dago Mike	KO	2 (25)	Dec 16, 1898	Aspen, Colorado, U.S.	
7	Draw	5–0–1 (1)	Fred O'Neil	PTS	20	Nov 14, 1898	Tivoli Theater, Aspen, Colorado, U.S.	
6	Win	5–0 (1)	Fred O'Neil	TKO	4 (4)	Jul 23, 1898	Davenport St. Music Hall, Omaha, Nebraska, U.S.	
5	NC	4–0 (1)	Tom Delaney	NC	4 (4)	Jun 1, 1897	United States of America	Exact date and result unknown
4	Win	4–0	Julius Segil	KO	4 (?)	Mar 3, 1897	United States of America	Exact date and location unknown
3	Win	3–0	Kid Harris	KO	4 (?)	Feb 2, 1897	United States of America	Exact date and location unknown
2	Win	2–0	Bert Crater	KO	3 (?)	Jan 1, 1897	Denver, Colorado, U.S.	Exact date unknown
1	Win	1–0	N. Smith	KO	7 (?)	Apr 19, 1896	Holbrooke Reservoir, La Junta, Colorado, U.S.	

Achievements
Preceded by Terry McGovern	World Featherweight Champion; November 28, 1901 – 1902; Recognition Withdrawn	Vacant Title next held by Abe Attell
