= Harlem Tommy Murphy =

American boxer (1885–1958)

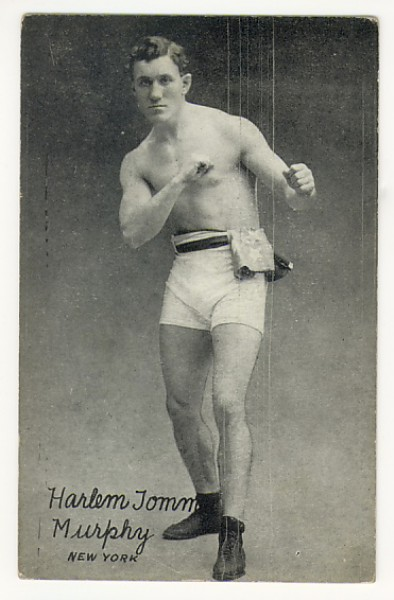

Personal information
- Nationality: United States
- Born: Tommy Murphy; April 13, 1885 New York, New York
- Died: November 26, 1958 (aged 73)
- Height: 5 ft 5 1/2 in (1.66 m)
- Weight: Lightweight; Featherweight; Bantamweight

Boxing career
- Stance: Orthodox

Boxing record
- Total fights: 142
- Wins: 87
- Win by KO: 25
- Losses: 30
- Draws: 25
- No contests: 0

Harlem Tommy Murphy (April 13, 1885 – November 26, 1958) was an American boxer whose career lasted from 1903 to 1917. He was a contender in three different divisions; being ranked in the bantamweight, featherweight and lightweight weight classes. During his tenure as a fighter, he squared off against some of the greatest boxers of all-time, including Abe Attell, Packey McFarland, Terry McGovern, Ad Wolgast and Harry Harris.

== Notable bouts ==
Result	Opponent	Type	Rd., Time	Date	Location	Notes
Loss	(United States) Willie Ritchie	PTS	20	1914-04-17	(United States) Coffroth's Arena, Daly City, California	For World Lightweight Title.
Loss	(United States) Packey McFarland	NWS	10	1913-10-17	(United States) Madison Square Garden, New York, New York	Newspaper Decision
Win	(United States) Ad Wolgast	PTS	20	1913-04-19	(United States) Coffroth's Arena, Daly City, California	
Draw	(United States) Ad Wolgast	PTS	20	1913-02-22	(United States) Coffroth's Arena, Daly City, California	
Draw	(United States) Abe Attell	PTS	20	1912-08-03	(United States) Coffroth's Arena, Daly City, California	
Win	(United States) Abe Attell	PTS	20	1912-03-09	(United States) Coffroth's Arena, Daly City, California	
Loss	(United States) Packey McFarland	PTS	20	1911-11-30	(United States) Coffroth's Arena, Daly City, California	
Loss	(United States) Packey McFarland	NWS	10	1911-04-18	(United States) Fairmont A.C., Bronx, New York	Newspaper Decision
Loss	(United States) Abe Attell	NWS	10	1910-05-20	(United States) New Amsterdam Opera House, New York, New York	Newspaper Decision
Win	(United States) Abe Attell	NWS	10	1910-04-28	(United States) Empire A.C., New York, New York	Newspaper Decision
Win	(United Kingdom) Owen Moran	PTS	20	1910-02-28	(United States) Dreamland Rink, San Francisco, California	
Win	(United States) Ad Wolgast	NWS	6	1909-09-01	(United States) Duquesne Garden, Pittsburgh, Pennsylvania	Newspaper Decision
Win	(United States) Matty Baldwin	PTS	12	1909-06-01	(United States) Armory A.A., Boston, Massachusetts	
Loss	(United Kingdom) Owen Moran	PTS	12	1909-03-23	(United States) Armory A.A., Boston, Massachusetts	
Loss	(United Kingdom) Owen Moran	NWS	10	1909-03-16	(United States) Fairmont A.C., Bronx, New York	Newspaper Decision
Loss	(United Kingdom) Owen Moran	NWS	10	1909-01-29	(United States) New Amsterdam Opera House, New York, New York	Newspaper Decision
Loss	(United States) Packey McFarland	NWS	6	1908-11-18	(United States) National A.C., Philadelphia, Pennsylvania	Newspaper Decision
Draw	(United States) Matty Baldwin	PTS	12	1908-11-18	(United States) Armory A.A., Boston, Massachusetts	
Loss	(United States) Harry Harris	DQ	8 (10)	1907-06-03	(United States) National S.C., New York, New York	
Draw	(United Kingdom) Johnny Summers	NWS	6	1907-05-22	(United States) National A.C., Philadelphia, Pennsylvania	
Win	(United States) Young Corbett II	NWS	6	1907-01-09	(United States) National A.C., Philadelphia, Pennsylvania	
Loss	(United States) Matty Baldwin	PTS	15	1906-12-12	(United States) Pythian Rink, Chelsea, Massachusetts	
Loss	(United States) Terry McGovern	TKO	1 (6)	1905-10-18	(United States) National A.C., Philadelphia, Pennsylvania	
Win	(Canada) George Dixon	KO	2 (6)	1905-09-20	(United States) National A.C., Philadelphia, Pennsylvania	
