= Oscar Gardner =

American boxer

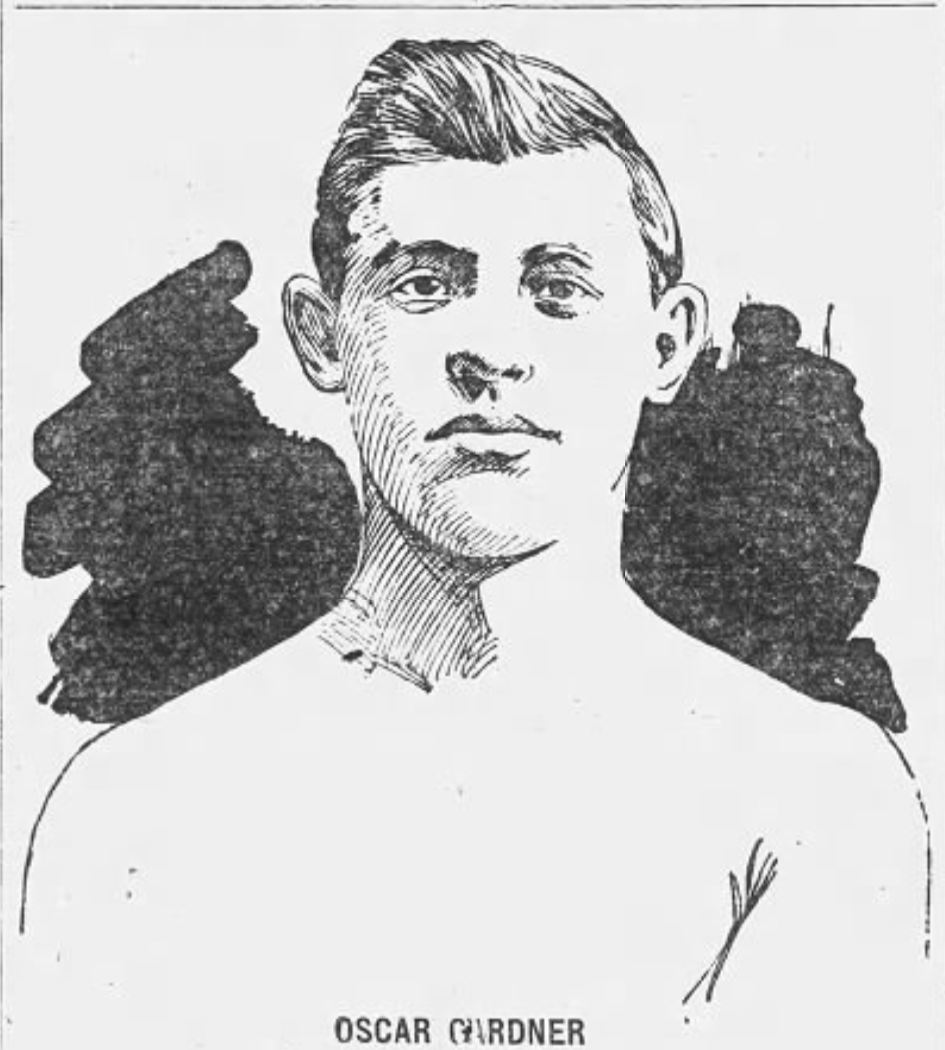
- Sketch from The Buffalo Times, 1898

Personal information
- Nickname: The Omaha Kid
- Born: Oscar Desire Gardner; May 19, 1872 Minneapolis, Minnesota, USA
- Died: December 25, 1928 (aged 56) Minneapolis, Minnesota, USA
- Height: 5 ft 3 in (1.60 m)
- Weight: Bantamweight; Featherweight

Boxing career
- Reach: 63 in (1.60 m)

Boxing record
- Total fights: 537-547
- Wins: 85
- Win by KO: 59
- Losses: 18
- Draws: 32
- No contests: 1

Oscar Gardner (May 19, 1872 – December 25, 1928) was an American bantamweight and featherweight boxer known as the Omaha Kid. He was a top contender for the Featherweight Championship of the World and the Featherweight Champion of America, though he never won any awards or titles; many claim this was due to poor refereeing. Gardner was small but unusually strong, tough in the ring but "quiet, affable..., gifted with a winning personality, who made friends easily" when not boxing. During his career, he fought between 537 and 547 battles (sources vary).

== Biography ==
=== Early life ===
Oscar Desire Gardner was born May 19, 1872, in Minneapolis, Minnesota, the middle son of Joseph Gardner and his French-Canadian wife Alvina (c. 1852-1917). He grew up on the east side of the city with older brother Joe, younger brother Eddie (also a boxer), and sister Grace. As a teenager, he and Eddie worked at the Salisbury & Satterlee mattress factory, where many of the workers "engag[ed] in rough and tumble battles... during the lunch hour." Gardner struggled at first and was often used by more practiced boxers to pad their stats, but eventually became a top contender and earned himself the nickname "The Fighting Machine." At 17, he moved to Sioux City, where he worked as a mattress maker and foreman and was active in the local boxing scene. He relocated to Omaha after learning he could earn more money in their pugilistic community, then returned to Minneapolis in 1891.

=== Career ===
Gardner stood almost 5'4" and weighed anywhere from 115 to 124 pounds during his career. His "one weakness" was his weak hands, which he broke at least 7 separate times. Gardner was skilled at the knockout and favored 20-25 round fights, which he sometimes fought only two days or three apart. He claimed not to train for matches and both drank and smoked cigars, oftentimes waiting to put out his smoke until right before entering the ring.

On April 7, 1898, Gardner was fighting George Stout in Columbus, Ohio when Stout tripped, fell, or was pushed down. Stout lost consciousness after hitting his head on the unpadded floor, cited by many as the fault of the event promoters, and he died the next morning. Gardner was brought to court, facing charges of manslaughter and prize-fighting, but was quickly acquitted.

In 1898, Gardner was a top contender for the World Featherweight title. In October, he knocked out Sam Kelley after fourteen rounds; earned a TKO against Solly Smith after six rounds the following February; and drew with Martin Flaherty two weeks later. Despite this success, he never won the championship. He lost his third and fourth attempts in 1900 and 1901 to Terry McGovern. Gardner retired in 1901 at age 29 and returned to Minneapolis.

Among those he fought were George Dixon, Harry Forbes, James J. Corbett, Eddie Santry, Dave Sullivan, Solly Smith, Torpedo Billy Murphy, Terry McGovern, Joe Bernstein, and Austin Rice.

=== Retirement ===
Gardner spent the first decade of his retirement in Minneapolis, where he owned a saloon called "The Only Omaha Kid." In 1912, he moved to Washington with a plan to open a fight club in Vancouver, and by 1914 he owned a boxing school in Portland, Oregon. In 1918, Gardner was reportedly back in Minneapolis, this time as a bar owner with his brother Eddie and, according to writer Jack Grace, as a politician, but was in Pittsburgh by 1924. He worked as a promoter with Tex Rickard for several years and in 1928 was working as a boxing judge and a factory watchman in Brooklyn. He contracted yellow jaundice in June 1928 but did not respond to treatment and was seriously ill by September. Gardner died on December 25, 1928, in a Minneapolis hospital. He was survived by his wife and his children, Oscar Jr. and Grace, who lived in Portland, Oregon; his two brothers; and his sister. At the time of his death, he had four grandsons and one granddaughter. Oscar Jr. debuted as a boxer on June 3, 1913, against Dick Hewitt.

He was inducted into the Minnesota Boxing Hall of Fame in 2012.
