= Terry McGovern (boxer) =

American boxer (1880–1918)

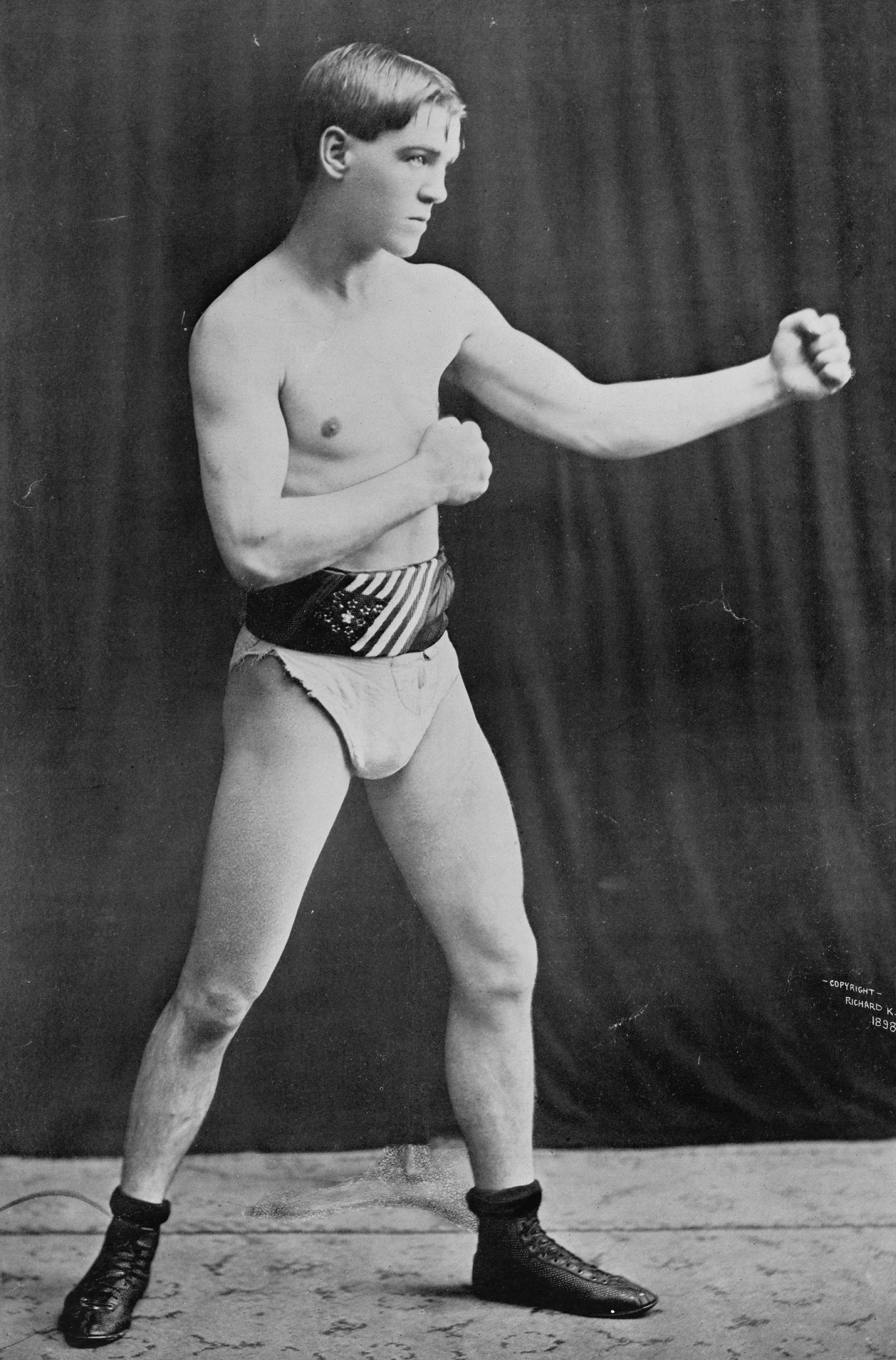

Personal information
- Nickname: Terrible Terry
- Born: John Terrence McGovern; March 9, 1880 Johnstown, Pennsylvania, US
- Died: February 22, 1918 (aged 37) Brooklyn, New York, US
- Height: 5 ft 3 in (1.60 m)
- Weight: Bantamweight; Featherweight; Lightweight

Boxing career
- Reach: 65 in (165 cm)
- Stance: Orthodox

Boxing record
- Total fights: 80
- Wins: 65
- Win by KO: 44
- Losses: 6
- Draws: 8
- No contests: 1

Terrible Terry McGovern (March 9, 1880 – February 22, 1918) was an American professional boxer who held the World Bantamweight and Featherweight Championships. He was born in Johnstown, Pennsylvania as Joseph Terrence McGovern. Through most of his career he was managed by Sam H. Harris, who remained a lifelong friend. Many boxing historians considered McGovern's greatest attributes his punching ability and signature charges rather than his boxing style or defensive technique. That the majority of his wins were by knockout speaks to the power of his punch.

== Early life ==
McGovern was born in Sharpsburg, Pennsylvania on March 9, 1880, to Thomas McGovern and Ellen (Monroe), both from Ireland. His mother Ellen had been widowed before meeting Thomas, so Terry was born with five older siblings. After the death of his father Thomas, his mother moved the family back to Brooklyn, New York. He tried to help support his widowed mother by peddling vegetables in South Brooklyn. Starting his professional career in 1897, some of his brothers would also attempt to make a living as boxers.

He began boxing at Brooklyn's Greenwood Athletic Club in preliminary bouts at age 16.

== Professional career ==
In his impressive career, McGovern took both the World Bantamweight and Featherweight Titles. He defended the World Featherweight Title at least five times against Joe Bernstein, Tommy White, Aurelio Herrera, and twice against Oscar Gardiner. He lost it to Young Corbett II who defeated him in World Featherweight Title fights on two separate occasions. His victory over Frank Erne, World Lightweight Champion, led some to claim he was also heir to the World Lightweight Title, though most sources today believe the bout was not a sanctioned title fight.

In his first 36 better-publicized bouts before taking the World Bantamweight Title, McGovern won an astounding 30, losing only to Johnny Snee and Tim Calahan. His winning streak did not end after taking the Bantamweight Title.

=== World Bantam Champ, 1899 ===
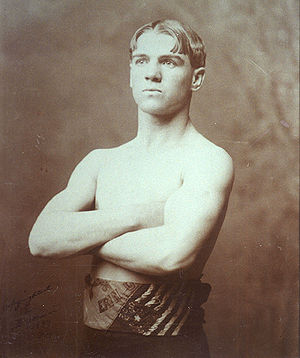
Portrait of McGovern

McGovern won the vacant World Bantamweight Championship on September 12, 1899, in a first-round knockout of British boxer Pedlar Palmer before a crowd of 10,000, using a series of heavy body blows. McGovern was only 19 years old and had been boxing professionally little more than two years. The bout took place at the Westchester Athletic Club in New York. The winner was to receive $7,500, and the loser $2,500, both sizable purses for the period, but far less than boxers would make for a World Title fight a decade later. The referee was George Siler. The fight was billed as the 116 pound championship. McGovern wore green trunks for the bout which he believed gave him luck. This was the first world championship bout under Queensberry Rules to end by a one-round knockout. McGovern never defended the title and relinquished it in 1900.

On November 18, 1899, he defeated New Yorker Patsy Haley in a first-round knockout in Chicago at Tattersall's in a non-title match. Like many of McGovern's early opponents, Haley was a skilled boxer, yet not a match for McGovern. Haley would become one of the best-known and most-respected New York-area referees in the 1920s and 1930s and referee an impressive array of World Title fights.

=== Win over Frank Erne, Lightweight Champion ===
On July 16, 1900, in an important bout, McGovern defeated World Lightweight Champion Frank Erne in a third-round technical knockout before a crowd of 13,000 in New York's Madison Square Garden. Erne knocked down McGovern with a blow to the head in the very first round, but McGovern took most of the count before landing on his feet and resuming the fight. Grinning and furious, McGovern was fastest in the third round showing his signature aggressive style. Erne, was down at least twice in the third round and had received a telling blow to the face from McGovern before his seconds threw in the sponge. Upon examination after the fight, Erne was found to have the most substantial injuries to his nose and mouth. The betting on the fight remained even for a considerable time, before McGovern took a slight lead before the fight. As Erne was the reigning World Lightweight Champion as a result of just beating Joe Gans, some sources credited McGovern with having taken the World Lightweight Crown as a result of winning the match by a TKO, but very few give him credit for the title today.

On December 22, 1899, McGovern defeated Harry Forbes in what was billed by some sources as a World Featherweight match, but the bout was not widely recognized as one. McGovern knocked out Forbes in the second round at the New Broadway Athletic Club. Forbes went down after a terrific right-handed uppercut to the chin from McGovern, who was the aggressor throughout the short match. McGovern had beaten Forbes earlier in a 15th-round knockout in Brooklyn on October 1, 1898.

=== World Featherweight Champ, 1900 ===
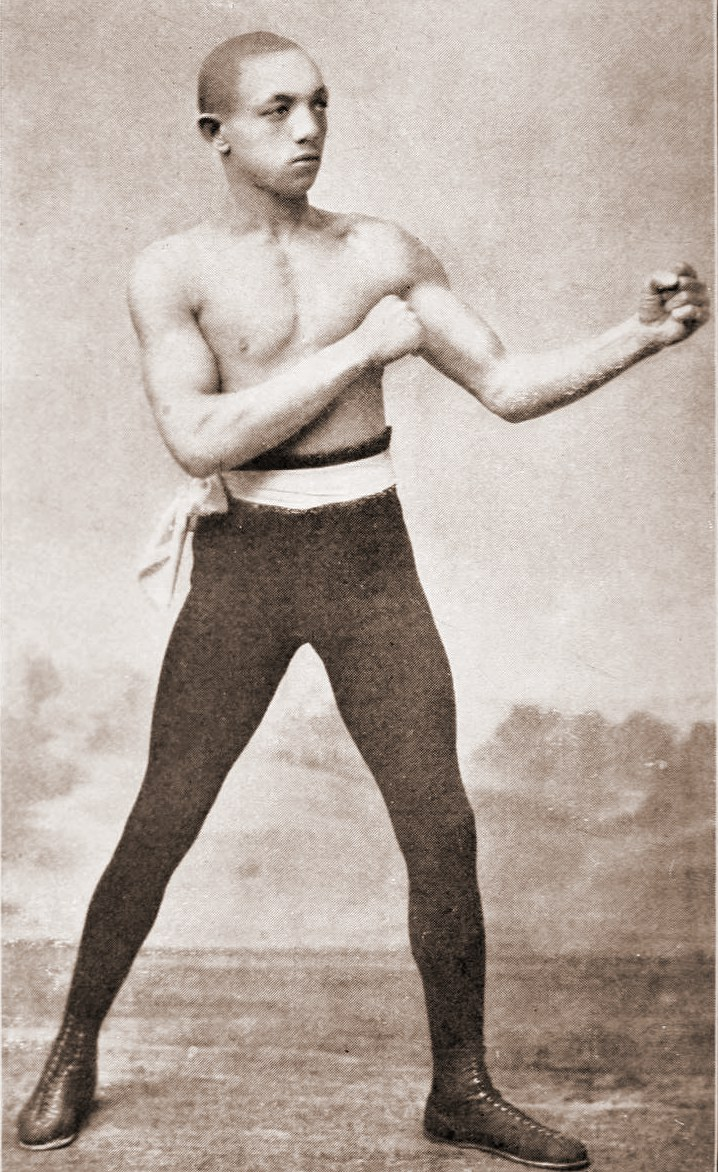
George Dixon

McGovern moved up in weight from Bantam and captured the World Featherweight Championship from George Dixon on January 9, 1900, by scoring a technical knockout in the eighth round at the Broadway Athletic Club in New York. Dixon was not a favorite in the late betting. McGovern seemed to dominate from the sixth round on, using frequent straight, short-arm punches into Dixon's body and face. He eventually scored a knock down. The bout was ended when Dixon's manager threw in the sponge ending the match. The great lightweight Charlie White was in McGovern's corner for the bout. Some controversy existed among bettors when the officials ruled the fight a knockout when it technically was not, as no ten count was completed against Dixon. A betting controversy was inevitable, as one source wrote that the Dixon fight was "one of the heaviest betting bouts ever staged in America".

==== Defenses of Feather Title ====
On June 12, 1900, McGovern defeated Tommy White at the Seaside Sporting Club in a decisive third-round knockout in Brooklyn, New York. After two minutes of fighting in the first round, the electric lighting in the club went out, nearly causing a panic among the crowd. Ten minutes later the lights went on again and the fighting resumed. An attendant fan, Frank Conlin, kept the crowd sedate by whistling a series of tunes. White was seriously outclassed in the battle, as he was knocked down once in the first round, twice in the second, and four times in the third. McGovern made no objection to White being 1/2 pound overweight at weigh in. Referee Johnny White did a full ten count against White in the third round to end the bout.

On November 2, 1900, McGovern defeated the great New York Jewish featherweight Joe Bernstein in Louisville, Kentucky, in a World Featherweight Title fight. The bout ended in a seventh-round knockout. Bernstein was said to have "made a poor showing from the beginning." The fight was stopped by the referee George Siler when Bernstein could not rise in the eight round, after more than one knockdown, and a full eight count.

McGovern scored a knockout over the legendary Black boxer Joe Gans in a non-title match on December 13, 1900. Gans claimed that he threw the fight. The issue of whether Gans had quit early and intentionally ended the fight was put to a Chicago District Attorney. Both fighters had warrants issued for their arrest for disturbing the peace which were thrown out the day after the fight.

On April 30, 1901, before a crowd of 8,000, McGovern defeated Oscar Gardiner at the Mechanics Pavilion in San Francisco in a fourth-round knockout. They fought for a purse of $5,000 with the winner taking 75 percent. In the fourth round, Gardiner was knocked down three times before losing to a ten count after a blow to the stomach. Gardiner took a while to recover from the blows of McGovern after the count, and it was feared he was hurt seriously.

In another defense of his World Featherweight Title, McGovern was credited with knocking out Aurelio Herrera in five rounds. Herrera afterwards claimed he had been doped during the fight.

=== Loss of Feather Title, 1901 ===
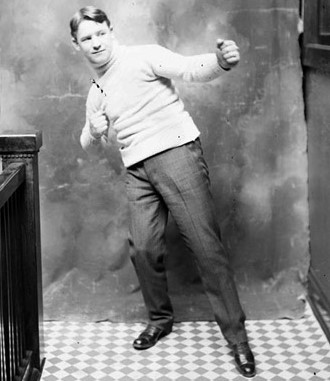
Young Corbett II

McGovern lost his World Featherweight Crown when he was stopped by Young Corbett II in two rounds on November 28, 1901. Corbett also won their rematch. Of their March 31, 1903, rematch in San Francisco, Young Corbett was said to have the best of the last three rounds of the 11th-round knockout. McGovern had only a slight lead in the first eight rounds, as well as only a slight lead in the early betting.

On March 14, 1906, McGovern lost a lightweight match to Battling Nelson at the National Athletic Club in Philadelphia in a six-round newspaper decision. The fight was described as "one of the fastest and most vicious battles ever seen in the ring." In both the fourth and fifth rounds Nelson staggered McGovern with heavy lefts to the neck and jaw. Although McGovern landed repeatedly on Nelson, his blows did not slow the assault of his opponent. He did not appear to gain an advantage until the sixth round when he became the aggressor. The bout could not have a referee ruling on points, but the Minneapolis Journal and four local Philadelphia newspapers gave Nelson the advantage.

McGovern finished his career with a record of 65 wins (42 KOs) 5 losses and 5 draws. As was common in that era, he also engaged in many No Decision bouts. In 2003, McGovern was named to the Ring Magazines list of 100 greatest punchers of all time. Boxing historian Nat Fleischer ranked McGovern as the greatest featherweight of all time. He had an estimated lifetime earnings of $203,000, which included his income as a vaudeville entertainer.

== Life after boxing ==
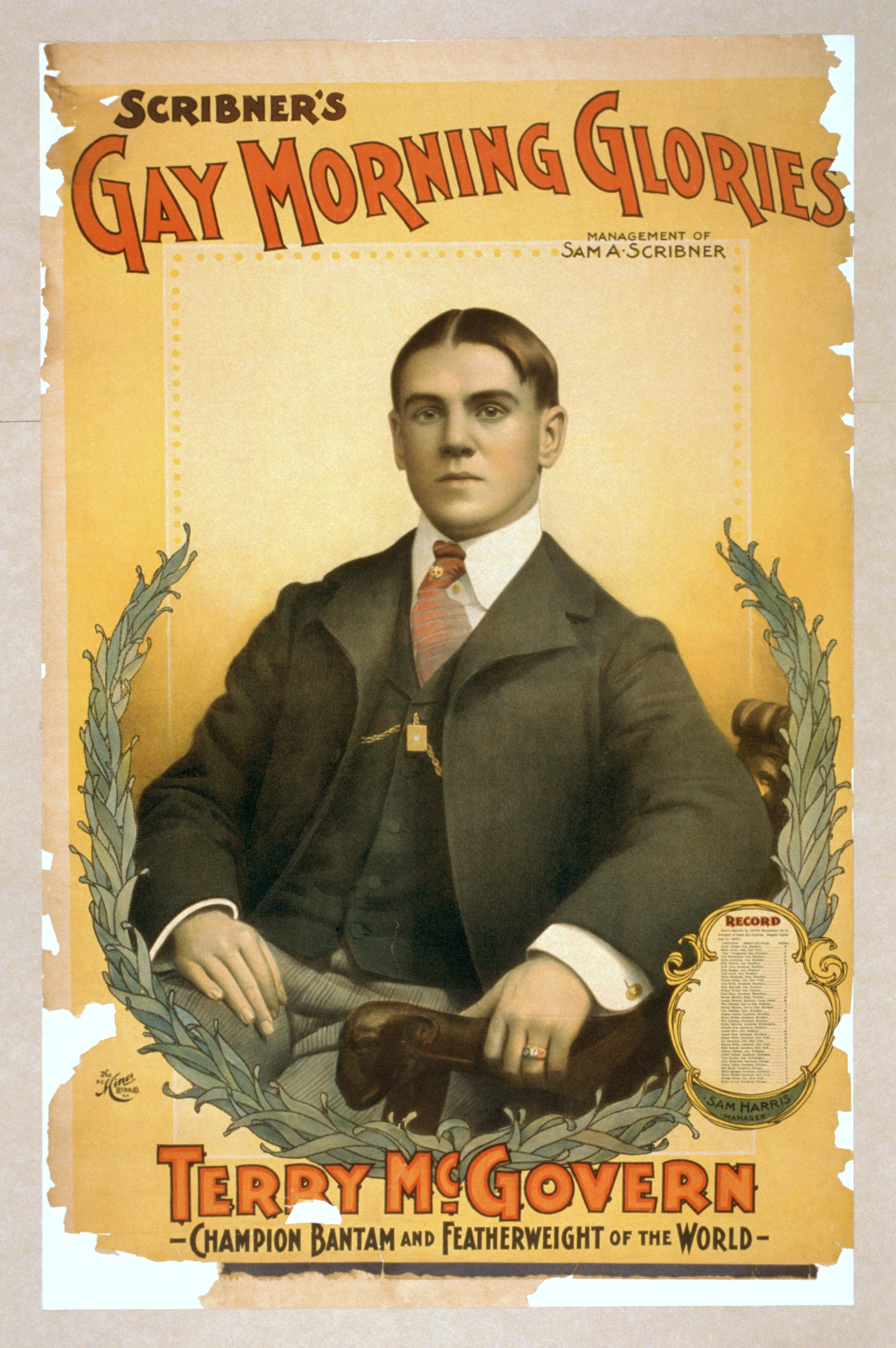
Vaudeville poster of McGovern, managed by Sam H. Harris

Like many boxers, McGovern lost some of his fortune betting on horses at the track before his retirement from boxing. He purchased a race horse and attempted to have one of his brothers ride as a jockey. He showed increasingly poor judgement in his betting as he slipped into mental illness.

McGovern spent much of his later life in mental institutions, though he was able to intermittently work odd jobs. He was working as a ticket taker at the Grand Opera House in Brooklyn near the end of his life. Two months prior to his death he was visiting Camp Upton, a WW I military port of embarkation on Long Island when he took ill. He died of pneumonia and Bright's disease, a kidney ailment in the charity ward of King's County Hospital, Brooklyn, New York, on February 22, 1918, at the age of 37. He died relatively poor, considering his lifetime earnings. In his final years, he lived on a pension given to him by his manager and promoter Sam Harris. Harris had been managing some of McGovern's remaining wealth as a trust fund, and was able to give a complete estate of $10,000 to McGovern's widow, which included the home they had been living in when McGovern died. Harris looked after McGovern in his waning years, as did his friend Joe Humphries. McGovern was married and left one son, Joe, of 19 years, and had two surviving brothers, Philip and Hugh. His final service was at the Church of St. John the Evangelist, and he was subsequently buried at Holy Cross Cemetery in Brooklyn.

== Professional boxing record ==
All information in this section is derived from BoxRec, unless otherwise stated.

=== Official record ===
80 fights	60 wins	4 losses
By knockout	45	2
By decision	14	0
By disqualification	1	2
Draws	3	
No contests	1	
Newspaper decisions/draws	12	

All newspaper decisions are officially regarded as “no decision” bouts and are not counted in the win/loss/draw column.

No.	Result	Record	Opponent	Type	Round	Date	Location	Notes
80	Draw	60–4–3 (13)	Spike Robson	NWS	6	May 26, 1906	National A.C., New York City, New York, U.S.	
79	Draw	60–4–3 (12)	Young Loughrey	NWS	6	May 16, 1906	National A.C., Philadelphia, Pennsylvania, U.S.	
78	Draw	60–4–3 (11)	Young Corbett II	NWS	6	Oct 17, 1906	National A.C., Philadelphia, Pennsylvania, U.S.	
77	Draw	60–4–3 (10)	Jimmy Britt	NWS	10	May 28, 1906	Madison Square Garden, New York City, New York, U.S.	
76	Loss	60–4–3 (9)	Battling Nelson	NWS	6	Mar 14, 1906	National A.C., Philadelphia, Pennsylvania, U.S.	
75	Win	60–4–3 (8)	Harlem Tommy Murphy	TKO	1 (6)	Oct 18, 1905	National A.C., Philadelphia, Pennsylvania, U.S.	
74	Win	59–4–3 (8)	Eddie Hanlon	TKO	4 (6)	Oct 10, 1904	Industrial Hall, Philadelphia, Pennsylvania, U.S.	
73	Win	58–4–3 (8)	Yock Henniger	KO	2 (3)	Jan 1, 1904	Lyric Theatre, Allentown, Pennsylvania, U.S.	
72	Win	57–4–3 (8)	Billy Willis	NWS	6	Dec 19, 1903	National A.C., Philadelphia, Pennsylvania, U.S.	
71	Win	57–4–3 (7)	Jimmy Briggs	PTS	15	Oct 20, 1903	Criterion A.C., Boston, Massachusetts, U.S.	
70	Win	56–4–3 (7)	Billy Willis	NWS	6	Oct 3, 1903	National A.C., Philadelphia, Pennsylvania, U.S.	
69	Win	56–4–3 (6)	Lew Ryall	NWS	6	Sep 26, 1903	National A.C., Philadelphia, Pennsylvania, U.S.	
68	Loss	56–4–3 (5)	Young Corbett II	KO	11 (20)	Mar 31, 1903	Mechanic's Pavilion, San Francisco, California, U.S.	For world featherweight title
67	Win	56–3–3 (5)	Billy Maynard	KO	4 (6)	Feb 25, 1902	Penn Art Club, Philadelphia, Pennsylvania, U.S.	
66	Win	55–3–3 (5)	Joe Bernstein	NWS	6	Feb 6, 1902	Industrial Hall, Philadelphia, Pennsylvania, U.S.	
65	Win	55–3–3 (4)	Dave Sullivan	TKO	15 (25)	Feb 2, 1902	Southern A.C., Louisville, Kentucky, U.S.	
64	Loss	54–3–3 (4)	Young Corbett II	KO	2 (?)	Nov 28, 1901	Coliseum, Hartford, Connecticut, U.S.	Lost world featherweight title
63	Win	54–2–3 (4)	Aurelio Herrera	KO	5 (20)	May 29, 1901	Mechanic's Pavilion, San Francisco, California, U.S.	Retained world featherweight title
62	Win	53–2–3 (4)	Oscar Gardner	KO	4 (?)	Apr 30, 1901	Mechanic's Pavilion, San Francisco, California, U.S.	Retained world featherweight title
61	Win	52–2–3 (4)	Joe Gans	KO	2 (6)	Dec 13, 1900	Tattersall's, Chicago, Illinois, U.S.	
60	Win	51–2–3 (4)	Kid Broad	PTS	6	Nov 13, 1900	Tattersall's, Chicago, Illinois, U.S.	
59	Win	50–2–3 (4)	Joe Bernstein	KO	7 (25)	Nov 2, 1900	Nonpareil A.C., Louisville, Kentucky, U.S.	Retained world featherweight title
58	Win	49–2–3 (4)	Frank Erne	TKO	3 (6)	Jul 16, 1900	Madison Square Garden, New York City, New York, U.S.	
57	Win	48–2–3 (4)	George Dixon	PTS	6	Jun 23, 1900	Tattersall's, Chicago, Illinois, U.S.	
56	Win	47–2–3 (4)	Tommy White	KO	3 (25)	Jun 12, 1900	Seaside A.C., New York City, New York, U.S.	Retained world featherweight title
55	Win	46–2–3 (4)	Ellwood McCloskey	NWS	6	May 21, 1900	Penn Art Club, Philadelphia, Pennsylvania, U.S.	
54	Win	46–2–3 (3)	Tommy Warren	TKO	1 (25)	Apr 20, 1900	Broadway A.C., New York City, New York, U.S.	
53	Draw	45–2–3 (3)	Tommy White	NWS	6	Apr 17, 1900	Tattersall's, Chicago, Illinois, U.S.	
52	Win	45–2–3 (2)	Eddie Lenny	KO	2 (6)	Mar 15, 1900	Industrial Hall, Philadelphia, Pennsylvania, U.S.	
51	Win	44–2–3 (2)	Oscar Gardner	KO	3 (25)	Mar 9, 1900	Broadway A.C., New York City, New York, U.S.	Retained world featherweight title
50	Win	43–2–3 (2)	Eddie Santry	TKO	5 (6)	Feb 1, 1900	Tattersall's, Chicago, Illinois, U.S.	Retained world featherweight title
49	Win	42–2–3 (2)	Jack Ward	TKO	1 (20)	Jan 29, 1900	North Avenue Rink, Baltimore, Maryland, U.S.	
48	Win	41–2–3 (2)	George Dixon	TKO	8 (25)	Jan 9, 1900	Broadway A.C., New York City, New York, U.S.	Won world featherweight title
47	Win	40–2–3 (2)	Harry Forbes	TKO	2 (25)	Dec 22, 1899	Broadway A.C., New York City, New York, U.S.	Retained world bantamweight title
46	Win	39–2–3 (2)	Charlie Mason	KO	2 (10)	Dec 18, 1899	People's A.C., Cincinnati, Ohio, U.S.	
45	Win	38–2–3 (2)	Freckles O'Brien	KO	1 (10)	Dec 18, 1899	People's A.C., Cincinnati, Ohio, U.S.	
44	Win	37–2–3 (2)	Kid Black	KO	3 (4)	Dec 12, 1899	Trocadero, Chicago, Illinois, U.S.	
43	Win	36–2–3 (2)	James J Corbett Jr.	KO	2 (4)	Dec 11, 1899	Trocadero, Chicago, Illinois, U.S.	
42	Win	35–2–3 (2)	Eddie Sprague	KO	2 (10)	Nov 30, 1899	Coliseum, Hartford, Connecticut, U.S.	
41	Win	34–2–3 (2)	Patsy Haley	KO	1 (6)	Nov 18, 1899	Tattersall's, Chicago, Illinois, U.S.	
40	Win	33–2–3 (2)	Turkey Point Billy Smith	KO	3 (6)	Nov 18, 1899	Tattersall's, Chicago, Illinois, U.S.	
39	Win	32–2–3 (2)	Billy Rotchford	KO	1 (6)	Oct 9, 1899	Tattersall's, Chicago, Illinois, U.S.	
38	Win	31–2–3 (2)	Fred Snyder	TKO	2 (6)	Sep 29, 1899	Westchester A.C., Tuckahoe, New York, U.S.	
37	Win	30–2–3 (2)	Pedlar Palmer	KO	1 (25)	Sep 12, 1899	Westchester A.C., Tuckahoe, New York, U.S.	Won world bantamweight title
36	Win	29–2–3 (2)	Johnny Ritchie	KO	3 (25)	Jul 1, 1899	Westchester A.C., Tuckahoe, New York, U.S.	
35	Win	28–2–3 (2)	Billy Barnett	KO	10 (20)	Jun 8, 1899	Broadway A.C., New York City, New York, U.S.	
34	Win	27–2–3 (2)	Sammy Kelly	KO	5 (20)	May 26, 1899	Broadway A.C., New York City, New York, U.S.	
33	Win	26–2–3 (2)	Joe Bernstein	PTS	25	Apr 28, 1899	Broadway A.C., New York City, New York, U.S.	
32	Win	25–2–3 (2)	Patsy Haley	KO	18 (25)	Mar 14, 1899	Lenox A.C., New York City, New York, U.S.	
31	Win	24–2–3 (2)	Fred Snyder	NWS	6	Feb 18, 1899	Nonpareil A.C., Philadelphia, Pennsylvania, U.S.	
30	Win	24–2–3 (1)	Casper Leon	KO	12 (25)	Jan 30, 1899	Greenwood A.C., New York City, New York, U.S.	
29	Win	23–2–3 (1)	Austin Rice	KO	14 (25)	Dec 31, 1898	Pelican A.C., New York City, New York, U.S.	
28	Win	22–2–3 (1)	Jimmy Rose	KO	2 (25)	Dec 17, 1898	Greenwood A.C., New York City, New York, U.S.	
27	Win	21–2–3 (1)	Patsy Donovan	KO	3 (6)	Nov 26, 1898	Nonpareil A.C., Philadelphia, Pennsylvania, U.S.	
26	Win	20–2–3 (1)	Tim Callahan	KO	10 (25)	Nov 19, 1898	Greenwood A.C., New York City, New York, U.S.	
25	Win	19–2–3 (1)	Harry Forbes	KO	15 (25)	Oct 1, 1898	Pelican A.C., New York City, New York, U.S.	
24	Win	18–2–3 (1)	Eugene Garcia	KO	5 (15)	Sep 15, 1898	Greenwood A.C., New York City, New York, U.S.	
23	Draw	17–2–3 (1)	Tim Callahan	PTS	20	Aug 20, 1898	Pelican A.C., New York City, New York, U.S.	
22	Win	17–2–2 (1)	George Monroe	DQ	7 (20)	Aug 4, 1898	Greenwood A.C., New York City, New York, U.S.	
21	Loss	16–2–2 (1)	Tim Callahan	DQ	11 (25)	Jul 23, 1898	Pelican A.C., New York City, New York, U.S.	
20	Win	16–1–2 (1)	George Monroe	KO	24 (25)	Jun 11, 1898	Greater New York A.C., New York City, New York, U.S.	
19	Draw	15–1–2 (1)	George Monroe	PTS	20	May 5, 1898	Waverly A.C., Yonkers, New York, U.S.	
18	Win	15–1–1 (1)	Fred Mayo	TKO	6 (10)	Apr 15, 1898	Jacque's Auditorium, Waterbury, Connecticut, U.S.	
17	Win	14–1–1 (1)	Pinky Evans	PTS	8	Mar 12, 1898	Waverly A.C., Yonkers, New York, U.S.	
16	Win	13–1–1 (1)	Billy Maynard	PTS	8	Feb 25, 1898	Waverly A.C., Yonkers, New York, U.S.	
15	Win	12–1–1 (1)	Jack Kelly	KO	2 (10)	Dec 31, 1897	National A.C., New York City, New York, U.S.	
14	Win	11–1–1 (1)	Charles Roden	PTS	6	Dec 18, 1897	Polo A.C., New York City, New York, U.S.	
13	Win	10–1–1 (1)	Harry Peterson	PTS	6	Nov 13, 1897	Polo A.C., New York City, New York, U.S.	
12	NC	9–1–1 (1)	Eddie Goodbody	ND	1 (4)	Oct 23, 1897	Greenwood A.C., New York City, New York, U.S.	
11	Win	9–1–1	Jack Doyle	TKO	7 (10)	Oct 9, 1897	Greenwood A.C., New York City, New York, U.S.	
10	Win	8–1–1	Johnny Reagan	TKO	6 (6)	Oct 2, 1897	Greenwood A.C., New York City, New York, U.S.	
9	Win	7–1–1	Jack Leon	TKO	7 (10)	Sep 18, 1897	Greenwood A.C., New York City, New York, U.S.	
8	Win	6–1–1	Billy Barrett	PTS	10	Aug 23, 1897	Greenwood A.C., New York City, New York, U.S.	
7	Win	5–1–1	Eddie Goodbody	PTS	10	Aug 16, 1897	Greenwood A.C., New York City, New York, U.S.	
6	Draw	4–1–1	Tommy Sullivan	PTS	10	Jun 19, 1897	Greenwood A.C., New York City, New York, U.S.	
5	Win	4–1	Tom McDermott	PTS	10	Jun 7, 1897	Greenwood A.C., New York City, New York, U.S.	
4	Win	3–1	Kid Dougherty	PTS	10	May 22, 1897	Greenwood A.C., New York City, New York, U.S.	
3	Win	2–1	Eddie Avery	PTS	4	May 5, 1897	Polo A.C., New York City, New York, U.S.	
2	Win	1–1	Frankie Barnes	PTS	10	Apr 17, 1897	Greenwood A.C., New York City, New York, U.S.	
1	Loss	0–1	Johnny Snee	DQ	4 (10)	Apr 3, 1897	Greenwood A.C., New York City, New York, U.S.	

=== Unofficial record ===
80 fights	66 wins	5 losses
By knockout	45	2
By decision	20	1
By disqualification	1	2
Draws	8	
No contests	1	

Record with the inclusion of newspaper decisions in the win/loss/draw column.

No.	Result	Record	Opponent	Type	Round	Date	Location	Notes
80	Draw	66–5–8 (1)	Spike Robson	NWS	6	May 26, 1906	National A.C., New York City, New York, U.S.	
79	Draw	66–5–7 (1)	Young Loughrey	NWS	6	May 16, 1906	National A.C., Philadelphia, Pennsylvania, U.S.	
78	Draw	66–5–6 (1)	Young Corbett II	NWS	6	Oct 17, 1906	National A.C., Philadelphia, Pennsylvania, U.S.	
77	Draw	66–5–5 (1)	Jimmy Britt	NWS	10	May 28, 1906	Madison Square Garden, New York City, New York, U.S.	
76	Loss	66–5–4 (1)	Battling Nelson	NWS	6	Mar 14, 1906	National A.C., Philadelphia, Pennsylvania, U.S.	
75	Win	66–4–4 (1)	Harlem Tommy Murphy	TKO	1 (6)	Oct 18, 1905	National A.C., Philadelphia, Pennsylvania, U.S.	
74	Win	65–4–4 (1)	Eddie Hanlon	TKO	4 (6)	Oct 10, 1904	Industrial Hall, Philadelphia, Pennsylvania, U.S.	
73	Win	64–4–4 (1)	Yock Henniger	KO	2 (3)	Jan 1, 1904	Lyric Theatre, Allentown, Pennsylvania, U.S.	
72	Win	63–4–4 (1)	Billy Willis	NWS	6	Dec 19, 1903	National A.C., Philadelphia, Pennsylvania, U.S.	
71	Win	62–4–4 (1)	Jimmy Briggs	PTS	15	Oct 20, 1903	Criterion A.C., Boston, Massachusetts, U.S.	
70	Win	61–4–4 (1)	Billy Willis	NWS	6	Oct 3, 1903	National A.C., Philadelphia, Pennsylvania, U.S.	
69	Win	60–4–4 (1)	Lew Ryall	NWS	6	Sep 26, 1903	National A.C., Philadelphia, Pennsylvania, U.S.	
68	Loss	59–4–4 (1)	Young Corbett II	KO	11 (20)	Mar 31, 1903	Mechanic's Pavilion, San Francisco, California, U.S.	For world featherweight title
67	Win	59–3–4 (1)	Billy Maynard	KO	4 (6)	Feb 25, 1902	Penn Art Club, Philadelphia, Pennsylvania, U.S.	
66	Win	58–3–4 (1)	Joe Bernstein	NWS	6	Feb 6, 1902	Industrial Hall, Philadelphia, Pennsylvania, U.S.	
65	Win	57–3–4 (1)	Dave Sullivan	TKO	15 (25)	Feb 2, 1902	Southern A.C., Louisville, Kentucky, U.S.	
64	Loss	56–3–4 (1)	Young Corbett II	KO	2 (?)	Nov 28, 1901	Coliseum, Hartford, Connecticut, U.S.	Lost world featherweight title
63	Win	56–2–4 (1)	Aurelio Herrera	KO	5 (20)	May 29, 1901	Mechanic's Pavilion, San Francisco, California, U.S.	Retained world featherweight title
62	Win	55–2–4 (1)	Oscar Gardner	KO	4 (?)	Apr 30, 1901	Mechanic's Pavilion, San Francisco, California, U.S.	Retained world featherweight title
61	Win	54–2–4 (1)	Joe Gans	KO	2 (6)	Dec 13, 1900	Tattersall's, Chicago, Illinois, U.S.	
60	Win	53–2–4 (1)	Kid Broad	PTS	6	Nov 13, 1900	Tattersall's, Chicago, Illinois, U.S.	
59	Win	52–2–4 (1)	Joe Bernstein	KO	7 (25)	Nov 2, 1900	Nonpareil A.C., Louisville, Kentucky, U.S.	Retained world featherweight title
58	Win	51–2–4 (1)	Frank Erne	TKO	3 (6)	Jul 16, 1900	Madison Square Garden, New York City, New York, U.S.	
57	Win	50–2–4 (1)	George Dixon	PTS	6	Jun 23, 1900	Tattersall's, Chicago, Illinois, U.S.	
56	Win	49–2–4 (1)	Tommy White	KO	3 (25)	Jun 12, 1900	Seaside A.C., New York City, New York, U.S.	Retained world featherweight title
55	Win	48–2–4 (1)	Ellwood McCloskey	NWS	6	May 21, 1900	Penn Art Club, Philadelphia, Pennsylvania, U.S.	
54	Win	47–2–4 (1)	Tommy Warren	TKO	1 (25)	Apr 20, 1900	Broadway A.C., New York City, New York, U.S.	
53	Draw	46–2–4 (1)	Tommy White	NWS	6	Apr 17, 1900	Tattersall's, Chicago, Illinois, U.S.	
52	Win	46–2–3 (1)	Eddie Lenny	KO	2 (6)	Mar 15, 1900	Industrial Hall, Philadelphia, Pennsylvania, U.S.	
51	Win	45–2–3 (1)	Oscar Gardner	KO	3 (25)	Mar 9, 1900	Broadway A.C., New York City, New York, U.S.	Retained world featherweight title
50	Win	44–2–3 (1)	Eddie Santry	TKO	5 (6)	Feb 1, 1900	Tattersall's, Chicago, Illinois, U.S.	Retained world featherweight title
49	Win	43–2–3 (1)	Jack Ward	TKO	1 (20)	Jan 29, 1900	North Avenue Rink, Baltimore, Maryland, U.S.	
48	Win	42–2–3 (1)	George Dixon	TKO	8 (25)	Jan 9, 1900	Broadway A.C., New York City, New York, U.S.	Won world featherweight title
47	Win	41–2–3 (1)	Harry Forbes	TKO	2 (25)	Dec 22, 1899	Broadway A.C., New York City, New York, U.S.	Retained world bantamweight title
46	Win	40–2–3 (1)	Charlie Mason	KO	2 (10)	Dec 18, 1899	People's A.C., Cincinnati, Ohio, U.S.	
45	Win	39–2–3 (1)	Freckles O'Brien	KO	1 (10)	Dec 18, 1899	People's A.C., Cincinnati, Ohio, U.S.	
44	Win	38–2–3 (1)	Kid Black	KO	3 (4)	Dec 12, 1899	Trocadero, Chicago, Illinois, U.S.	
43	Win	37–2–3 (1)	James J Corbett Jr.	KO	2 (4)	Dec 11, 1899	Trocadero, Chicago, Illinois, U.S.	
42	Win	36–2–3 (1)	Eddie Sprague	KO	2 (10)	Nov 30, 1899	Coliseum, Hartford, Connecticut, U.S.	
41	Win	35–2–3 (1)	Patsy Haley	KO	1 (6)	Nov 18, 1899	Tattersall's, Chicago, Illinois, U.S.	
40	Win	34–2–3 (1)	Turkey Point Billy Smith	KO	3 (6)	Nov 18, 1899	Tattersall's, Chicago, Illinois, U.S.	
39	Win	33–2–3 (1)	Billy Rotchford	KO	1 (6)	Oct 9, 1899	Tattersall's, Chicago, Illinois, U.S.	
38	Win	32–2–3 (1)	Fred Snyder	TKO	2 (6)	Sep 29, 1899	Westchester A.C., Tuckahoe, New York, U.S.	
37	Win	31–2–3 (1)	Pedlar Palmer	KO	1 (25)	Sep 12, 1899	Westchester A.C., Tuckahoe, New York, U.S.	Won world bantamweight title
36	Win	30–2–3 (1)	Johnny Ritchie	KO	3 (25)	Jul 1, 1899	Westchester A.C., Tuckahoe, New York, U.S.	
35	Win	29–2–3 (1)	Billy Barnett	KO	10 (20)	Jun 8, 1899	Broadway A.C., New York City, New York, U.S.	
34	Win	28–2–3 (1)	Sammy Kelly	KO	5 (20)	May 26, 1899	Broadway A.C., New York City, New York, U.S.	
33	Win	27–2–3 (1)	Joe Bernstein	PTS	25	Apr 28, 1899	Broadway A.C., New York City, New York, U.S.	
32	Win	26–2–3 (1)	Patsy Haley	KO	18 (25)	Mar 14, 1899	Lenox A.C., New York City, New York, U.S.	
31	Win	25–2–3 (1)	Fred Snyder	NWS	6	Feb 18, 1899	Nonpareil A.C., Philadelphia, Pennsylvania, U.S.	
30	Win	24–2–3 (1)	Casper Leon	KO	12 (25)	Jan 30, 1899	Greenwood A.C., New York City, New York, U.S.	
29	Win	23–2–3 (1)	Austin Rice	KO	14 (25)	Dec 31, 1898	Pelican A.C., New York City, New York, U.S.	
28	Win	22–2–3 (1)	Jimmy Rose	KO	2 (25)	Dec 17, 1898	Greenwood A.C., New York City, New York, U.S.	
27	Win	21–2–3 (1)	Patsy Donovan	KO	3 (6)	Nov 26, 1898	Nonpareil A.C., Philadelphia, Pennsylvania, U.S.	
26	Win	20–2–3 (1)	Tim Callahan	KO	10 (25)	Nov 19, 1898	Greenwood A.C., New York City, New York, U.S.	
25	Win	19–2–3 (1)	Harry Forbes	KO	15 (25)	Oct 1, 1898	Pelican A.C., New York City, New York, U.S.	
24	Win	18–2–3 (1)	Eugene Garcia	KO	5 (15)	Sep 15, 1898	Greenwood A.C., New York City, New York, U.S.	
23	Draw	17–2–3 (1)	Tim Callahan	PTS	20	Aug 20, 1898	Pelican A.C., New York City, New York, U.S.	
22	Win	17–2–2 (1)	George Monroe	DQ	7 (20)	Aug 4, 1898	Greenwood A.C., New York City, New York, U.S.	
21	Loss	16–2–2 (1)	Tim Callahan	DQ	11 (25)	Jul 23, 1898	Pelican A.C., New York City, New York, U.S.	
20	Win	16–1–2 (1)	George Monroe	KO	24 (25)	Jun 11, 1898	Greater New York A.C., New York City, New York, U.S.	
19	Draw	15–1–2 (1)	George Monroe	PTS	20	May 5, 1898	Waverly A.C., Yonkers, New York, U.S.	
18	Win	15–1–1 (1)	Fred Mayo	TKO	6 (10)	Apr 15, 1898	Jacque's Auditorium, Waterbury, Connecticut, U.S.	
17	Win	14–1–1 (1)	Pinky Evans	PTS	8	Mar 12, 1898	Waverly A.C., Yonkers, New York, U.S.	
16	Win	13–1–1 (1)	Billy Maynard	PTS	8	Feb 25, 1898	Waverly A.C., Yonkers, New York, U.S.	
15	Win	12–1–1 (1)	Jack Kelly	KO	2 (10)	Dec 31, 1897	National A.C., New York City, New York, U.S.	
14	Win	11–1–1 (1)	Charles Roden	PTS	6	Dec 18, 1897	Polo A.C., New York City, New York, U.S.	
13	Win	10–1–1 (1)	Harry Peterson	PTS	6	Nov 13, 1897	Polo A.C., New York City, New York, U.S.	
12	NC	9–1–1 (1)	Eddie Goodbody	ND	1 (4)	Oct 23, 1897	Greenwood A.C., New York City, New York, U.S.	
11	Win	9–1–1	Jack Doyle	TKO	7 (10)	Oct 9, 1897	Greenwood A.C., New York City, New York, U.S.	
10	Win	8–1–1	Johnny Reagan	TKO	6 (6)	Oct 2, 1897	Greenwood A.C., New York City, New York, U.S.	
9	Win	7–1–1	Jack Leon	TKO	7 (10)	Sep 18, 1897	Greenwood A.C., New York City, New York, U.S.	
8	Win	6–1–1	Billy Barrett	PTS	10	Aug 23, 1897	Greenwood A.C., New York City, New York, U.S.	
7	Win	5–1–1	Eddie Goodbody	PTS	10	Aug 16, 1897	Greenwood A.C., New York City, New York, U.S.	
6	Draw	4–1–1	Tommy Sullivan	PTS	10	Jun 19, 1897	Greenwood A.C., New York City, New York, U.S.	
5	Win	4–1	Tom McDermott	PTS	10	Jun 7, 1897	Greenwood A.C., New York City, New York, U.S.	
4	Win	3–1	Kid Dougherty	PTS	10	May 22, 1897	Greenwood A.C., New York City, New York, U.S.	
3	Win	2–1	Eddie Avery	PTS	4	May 5, 1897	Polo A.C., New York City, New York, U.S.	
2	Win	1–1	Frankie Barnes	PTS	10	Apr 17, 1897	Greenwood A.C., New York City, New York, U.S.	
1	Loss	0–1	Johnny Snee	DQ	4 (10)	Apr 3, 1897	Greenwood A.C., New York City, New York, U.S.	

== See also ==
- List of bantamweight boxing champions

Achievements
Vacant Title last held by Jimmy Barry	World Bantamweight Champion; September 12, 1899 – 1900; Vacated	Succeeded by Harry Harris
Preceded by George Dixon	World Featherweight Champion; January 9, 1900 – November 28, 1901	Succeeded by Young Corbett II
