= Solly Smith =

American boxer

- Smith in 1899

Personal information
- Nickname: The Celtic Mexican
- Born: Solomon Garcia Smith; March 6, 1871 Los Angeles, California
- Died: August 28, 1933 (aged 62)
- Height: 5 ft 6 in (168 cm)
- Weight: Welterweight; Lightweight; Featherweight

Boxing career
- Reach: 70 in (178 cm)
- Stance: Orthodox

Boxing record
- Total fights: 66
- Wins: 30
- Win by KO: 18
- Losses: 13
- Draws: 20
- No contests: 3

Solomon Garcia Smith (March 6, 1871 – August 28, 1933) was an American professional boxer in the featherweight division. He was a World Featherweight champion and is the first world champion of Hispanic descent.

== Early life ==
Smith was born in Los Angeles, the son of a Mexican mother and an Irish father. He was an outstanding long-distance track runner in his youth, which may have later aided his ability to endure long boxing bouts.

== Professional career ==
Solomon Garcia Smith made his professional debut in 1888 at the age of 17. In his 21st bout on September 25, 1893, he challenged future hall of famer George Dixon for the World Featherweight Championship but was defeated by seventh-round tko. The fight drew the largest paying crowd recorded at Brooklyn's Coney Island Athletic Club. After the bout, Smith was arrested for participating in a fight with Johnny Griffin in Roby, Indiana, two months earlier. Wyatt Earp had been the timekeeper.

He improved his skills in subsequent bouts and established himself as one of the top fighters in the bantamweight and featherweight divisions, fighting to draws against future hall of fame member Young Griffo and future two-division champion Frank Erne, along with scoring quality wins over opponents such as former champion Torpedo Billy Murphy and avenging a disqualification loss to Oscar Gardner.

=== World Featherweight Championship ===
The crowning moment of Smith's career came on October 4, 1897, when he defeated George Dixon in a rematch bout to capture the World Featherweight title, thus ending the Canadian champion's six-year reign. The San Francisco Call wrote of Smith's performance: "Instead of swinging wild and recklessly, as he was wont to do in his early fighting days, he gauged his distance and timed his blows like a polished veteran. His quick ducking under the left arm of his opponent to avoid a jaw warmer was a revelation to his admirers, who repeatedly cheered him when he escaped the hot shots aimed at the jaw point by Professor Dixon"

Smith was seen as a promising champion, having avenged losses to two of the three men who held victories over him up to that point, Dixon and Gardner, with the third being reigning lightweight champion and future hall of fame member Kid Lavigne who had outpointed Smith in an eight round contest. However, after twice retaining his title, he relinquished it due to a mishap against Dave Sullivan. Smith had the misfortune to break his left arm near the wrist in the second round of their bout, ending his chances to give a good showing. Unable to use his left at all in the fourth and fifth rounds, he was deemed unable to continue.

His career took a downward spiral following that loss as he won only one out of the fifteen remaining bouts in his career. He retired after a knockout loss to Billy Snailham in 1904.

== Professional boxing record ==
All information in this section is derived from BoxRec, unless otherwise stated.

=== Official Record ===
66 fights	29 wins	13 losses
By knockout	18	7
By decision	7	4
By disqualification	4	2
Draws	20	
No contests	3	
Newspaper decisions/draws	1	

All newspaper decisions are officially regarded as “no decision” bouts and are not counted as a win, loss or draw.

No.	Result	Record	Opponent	Type	Round	Date	Age	Location	Notes
66	Loss	29–13–20 (4)	Billy Snailham	KO	3 (20)	Aug 26, 1904	33 years, 173 days	Hazard's Pavilion, Los Angeles, California, U.S.	
65	Loss	29–12–20 (4)	Billy DeCoursey	KO	10 (?)	Nov 11, 1902	31 years, 250 days	Hazard's Pavilion, Los Angeles, California, U.S.	
64	Loss	29–11–20 (4)	Kid McFadden	DQ	7 (?)	Sep 5, 1901	30 years, 183 days	Oak Park, Sacramento, California, U.S.	
63	Draw	29–10–20 (4)	Joe Bernstein	PTS	20	Jun 18, 1901	30 years, 104 days	Hazard's Pavilion, Los Angeles, California, U.S.	
62	Draw	29–10–19 (4)	Joe Bernstein	PTS	20	May 10, 1900	29 years, 65 days	Hazard's Pavilion, Los Angeles, California, U.S.	
61	Loss	29–10–18 (4)	Joe Bernstein	DQ	14 (25)	Jun 22, 1900	29 years, 108 days	Broadway A.C., New York City, New York, U.S.	
60	Win	29–9–18 (4)	Billy Maynard	KO	10 (20)	May 28, 1900	29 years, 83 days	Sampson A.C., New York City, New York, U.S.	
59	Draw	28–9–18 (4)	Turkey Point Billy Smith	PTS	6	Mar 17, 1900	29 years, 11 days	Tattersall's, Chicago, Illinois, U.S.	
58	Loss	28–9–17 (4)	Billy Barrett	PTS	20	Mar 3, 1900	28 years, 362 days	Greenwood A.C., New York City, New York, U.S.	
57	Draw	28–8–17 (4)	Frank Patterson	PTS	25	Jan 15, 1900	28 years, 315 days	Hercules A.C., New York City, New York, U.S.	
56	Loss	28–8–16 (4)	Jack McClelland	DQ	6 (?)	Oct 2, 1899	28 years, 210 days	Pittsburgh, Pennsylvania, U.S.	
55	Loss	28–7–16 (4)	Joe Bernstein	KO	13 (25)	Aug 18, 1899	28 years, 165 days	Broadway A.C., New York City, New York, U.S.	
54	Draw	28–6–16 (4)	Frank Patterson	PTS	25	Jul 10, 1899	28 years, 126 days	Coney Island A.C., New York City, New York, U.S.	
53	Draw	28–6–15 (4)	Frank Patterson	PTS	20	May 20, 1899	28 years, 75 days	Greenwood A.C., New York City, New York, U.S.	
52	Loss	28–6–14 (4)	Oscar Gardner	KO	6 (25)	Feb 7, 1899	27 years, 338 days	Lenox A.C., New York City, New York, U.S.	Featherweight Championship of America
51	Loss	28–5–14 (4)	Dave Sullivan	TKO	5 (25)	Sep 26, 1898	27 years, 204 days	Greater New York A.C., New York City, New York, U.S.	Lost world featherweight title
50	Draw	28–4–14 (4)	Tommy White	PTS	25	Aug 1, 1898	27 years, 148 days	Greater New York A.C., New York City, New York, U.S.	Retained world featherweight title
49	Win	28–4–13 (4)	Billy O'Donnell	DQ	7 (20)	Jul 7, 1898	27 years, 123 days	Olympic A.C., Buffalo, New York, U.S.	Retained world featherweight title
48	Draw	27–4–13 (4)	Eddie Santry	PTS	6	Apr 18, 1898	27 years, 43 days	Tattersall's, Chicago, Illinois, U.S.	
47	Win	27–4–12 (4)	George Dixon	PTS	20	Oct 4, 1897	26 years, 212 days	Woodward's Pavilion, San Francisco, California, U.S.	Won world featherweight title
46	Win	26–4–12 (4)	Johnny Griffin	KO	7 (20)	Aug 20, 1897	26 years, 167 days	Woodward's Pavilion, San Francisco, California, U.S.	
45	Win	25–4–12 (4)	Martin Flaherty	PTS	25	May 4, 1897	26 years, 59 days	Broadway A.C., New York City, New York, U.S.	
44	Win	24–4–12 (4)	Oscar Gardner	PTS	20	Mar 13, 1897	26 years, 7 days	Broadway A.C., New York City, New York, U.S.	
43	Draw	23–4–12 (4)	Tommy White	PTS	25	Jan 12, 1897	25 years, 312 days	Bohemian Sporting Club, New York City, New York, U.S.	
42	Win	23–4–11 (4)	Willie Smith	TKO	8 (20)	Nov 9, 1896	25 years, 248 days	National Sporting Club, Covent Garden, London, England, U.K.	Billed world 118lbs title
41	Draw	22–4–11 (4)	Johnny Lavack	PTS	10	Jun 30, 1896	25 years, 116 days	Red Cross Rink, Cleveland, Ohio, U.S.	
40	Win	22–4–10 (4)	Frank Patterson	PTS	10	Jun 22, 1896	25 years, 108 days	Eastern A.C., New York City, New York, U.S.	
39	Draw	21–4–10 (4)	Dolly Lyons	PTS	10	Jun 1, 1896	25 years, 87 days	South Brooklyn A.C., New York City, New York, U.S.	
38	Win	21–4–9 (4)	Jerry Barnett	TKO	5 (6)	Mar 21, 1896	25 years, 15 days	Grand Central Palace, New York City, New York, U.S.	Police intervened
37	Draw	20–4–9 (4)	Johnny Lavack	PTS	15	Feb 22, 1896	24 years, 353 days	West Newton Street Armory, Boston, Massachusetts, U.S.	
36	Win	20–4–8 (4)	Torpedo Billy Murphy	TKO	14 (20)	Dec 23, 1895	24 years, 292 days	Olympic Club, New Orleans, Louisiana, U.S.	Police intervened
35	Win	19–4–8 (4)	George Siddons	UD	8	May 15, 1895	24 years, 70 days	Manhattan A.C., New York City, New York, U.S.	
34	Win	18–4–8 (4)	Jack Mullen	PTS	6	Apr 11, 1895	24 years, 36 days	Leland Opera House, Albany, New York, U.S.	
33	ND	17–4–8 (4)	Jerome Quigley	ND	4	Mar 22, 1895	24 years, 16 days	Philadelphia, Pennsylvania, U.S.	
32	ND	17–4–8 (3)	Billy McCarthy	ND	4	Mar 16, 1895	24 years, 10 days	Philadelphia, Pennsylvania, U.S.	
31	Draw	17–4–8 (2)	Tom Denny	PTS	10	Mar 4, 1895	23 years, 363 days	Seaside A.C., Coney Island, New York, U.S.	
30	Loss	17–4–7 (2)	Oscar Gardner	DQ	5 (15)	Nov 27, 1894	23 years, 266 days	Buffalo A.C., Buffalo, New York, U.S.	Smith was DQ'd for punching Gardner while he was down
29	Draw	17–3–7 (2)	Johnny Van Heest	PTS	15	Oct 26, 1894	23 years, 234 days	Buffalo A.C., Buffalo, New York, U.S.	
28	Draw	17–3–6 (2)	Frank Erne	PTS	10	Oct 2, 1894	23 years, 210 days	Liedertafel Hall, Buffalo, New York, U.S.	
27	Draw	17–3–5 (2)	George "Kid" Lavigne	PTS	8	Mar 7, 1894	23 years, 1 day	Arbeiter Hall, Saginaw, Michigan, U.S.	Pre-arranged draw if lasting the distance
26	Draw	17–3–4 (2)	Young Griffo	PTS	6	Jan 3, 1894	22 years, 303 days	Tivoli Theater, Chicago, Illinois, U.S.	
25	Win	17–3–3 (2)	Dan Ryan	DQ	4 (6)	Dec 1, 1893	22 years, 270 days	Tivoli Theater, Chicago, Illinois, U.S.	
24	Win	16–3–3 (2)	Jimmy Murphy	KO	2 (6)	Nov 13, 1893	22 years, 252 days	Tattersall's, Chicago, Illinois, U.S.	
23	Loss	15–3–3 (2)	George Dixon	TKO	7 (?)	Sep 25, 1893	22 years, 203 days	Coney Island A.C., New York City, New York, U.S.	Lost world featherweight title claim; For world featherweight title
22	Win	15–2–3 (2)	Johnny Griffin	KO	4 (?)	Jul 10, 1893	22 years, 126 days	Columbian Athletic Club, Roby, Indiana, U.S.	Won world featherweight title claim
21	Loss	14–2–3 (2)	Oscar Gardner	KO	6 (?)	Jun 10, 1893	22 years, 96 days	Minneapolis, Minnesota, U.S.	
20	Loss	14–1–3 (2)	Oscar Gardner	PTS	6	May 8, 1893	22 years, 63 days	Phoenix A.C., Saint Paul, Minnesota, U.S.	
19	Win	14–0–3 (2)	Frankie McHugh	NWS	6	Apr 15, 1893	22 years, 40 days	2nd Regiment Armory, Chicago, Illinois, U.S.	
18	Win	14–0–3 (1)	Johnny Van Heest	KO	14 (?)	Dec 29, 1892	21 years, 298 days	California A.C., San Francisco, California, U.S.	
17	Draw	13–0–3 (1)	George Siddons	PTS	56 (?)	Sep 29, 1892	21 years, 207 days	California A.C., San Francisco, California, U.S.	
16	Win	13–0–2 (1)	Dan Daly	KO	3 (?)	Jul 8, 1892	21 years, 124 days	Pacific A.C., San Francisco, California, U.S.	
15	Win	12–0–2 (1)	Dal Hawkins	KO	13	May 24, 1892	21 years, 79 days	California A.C., San Francisco, California, U.S.	A finish fight
14	Win	11–0–2 (1)	Harry Dally	PTS	4	Mar 30, 1892	21 years, 24 days	California A.C., San Francisco, California, U.S.	
13	Win	10–0–2 (1)	Tommy Smith	KO	2 (?)	Feb 25, 1892	20 years, 356 days	New Cribb A.C., Los Angeles, California, U.S.	
12	Win	9–0–2 (1)	Danny Mahoney	KO	15 (?)	Dec 3, 1891	20 years, 272 days	Pastime A.C., Los Angeles, California, U.S.	Won vacant featherweight Championship of the Coast
11	Win	8–0–2 (1)	Billy Manning	KO	6 (?)	Aug 27, 1891	20 years, 174 days	Pastime A.C., Los Angeles, California, U.S.	Won vacant bantamweight championship of Southern California
10	Draw	7–0–2 (1)	Dave Williams	PTS	10	Sep 3, 1890	19 years, 181 days	Pasadena, California, U.S.	
9	Win	7–0–1 (1)	Young Abbott	PTS	4	Dec 5, 1889	18 years, 274 days	Los Angeles, California, U.S.	Exact date unknown
8	Win	6–0–1 (1)	Billy Jones	TKO	13 (?)	Dec 1, 1889	18 years, 270 days	Los Angeles, California, U.S.	Exact date unknown
7	Win	5–0–1 (1)	Pete Cummings	TKO	1 (?)	Nov 1, 1889	18 years, 240 days	Los Angeles, California, U.S.	
6	Win	4–0–1 (1)	Young Billy Moore	TKO	5 (?)	Oct 1, 1889	18 years, 209 days	Los Angeles, California, U.S.	Exact date unknown
5	Win	3–0–1 (1)	Young Billy Moore	PTS	?	Sep 1, 1889	18 years, 179 days	Los Angeles, California, U.S.	Exact date and decision unknown
4	Win	2–0–1 (1)	Jack Golden	KO	2 (?)	Jun 1, 1889	18 years, 87 days	Los Angeles, California, U.S.	
3	NC	1–0–1 (1)	Joe 'Kid' Hogan	NC	29 (?)	Dec 12, 1888	17 years, 281 days	Sacramento, California, U.S.	LA Times Feb 25, 1892 reported this as 32-round draw
2	Draw	1–0–1	Joe Soto	PTS	6	Aug 1, 1888	17 years, 148 days	Los Angeles, California, U.S.	Exact date unknown
1	Win	1–0	Billy Smith	TKO	7 (?)	Jul 1, 1888	17 years, 117 days	Los Angeles, California, U.S.	Professional debut(?); Exact date unknown; Not to be confused with Mysterious Billy Smith

=== Unofficial record ===
66 fights	30 wins	13 losses
By knockout	18	7
By decision	8	4
By disqualification	4	2
Draws	20	
No contests	3	

Record with the inclusion of newspaper decisions to the win/loss/draw column.

No.	Result	Record	Opponent	Type	Round	Date	Age	Location	Notes
66	Loss	30–13–20 (3)	Billy Snailham	KO	3 (20)	Aug 26, 1904	33 years, 173 days	Hazard's Pavilion, Los Angeles, California, U.S.	
65	Loss	30–12–20 (3)	Billy DeCoursey	KO	10 (?)	Nov 11, 1902	31 years, 250 days	Hazard's Pavilion, Los Angeles, California, U.S.	
64	Loss	30–11–20 (3)	Kid McFadden	DQ	7 (?)	Sep 5, 1901	30 years, 183 days	Oak Park, Sacramento, California, U.S.	
63	Draw	30–10–20 (3)	Joe Bernstein	PTS	20	Jun 18, 1901	30 years, 104 days	Hazard's Pavilion, Los Angeles, California, U.S.	
62	Draw	30–10–19 (3)	Joe Bernstein	PTS	20	May 10, 1900	29 years, 65 days	Hazard's Pavilion, Los Angeles, California, U.S.	
61	Loss	30–10–18 (3)	Joe Bernstein	DQ	14 (25)	Jun 22, 1900	29 years, 108 days	Broadway A.C., New York City, New York, U.S.	
60	Win	30–9–18 (3)	Billy Maynard	KO	10 (20)	May 28, 1900	29 years, 83 days	Sampson A.C., New York City, New York, U.S.	
59	Draw	29–9–18 (3)	Turkey Point Billy Smith	PTS	6	Mar 17, 1900	29 years, 11 days	Tattersall's, Chicago, Illinois, U.S.	
58	Loss	29–9–17 (3)	Billy Barrett	PTS	20	Mar 3, 1900	28 years, 362 days	Greenwood A.C., New York City, New York, U.S.	
57	Draw	29–8–17 (3)	Frank Patterson	PTS	25	Jan 15, 1900	28 years, 315 days	Hercules A.C., New York City, New York, U.S.	
56	Loss	29–8–16 (3)	Jack McClelland	DQ	6 (?)	Oct 2, 1899	28 years, 210 days	Pittsburgh, Pennsylvania, U.S.	
55	Loss	29–7–16 (3)	Joe Bernstein	KO	13 (25)	Aug 18, 1899	28 years, 165 days	Broadway A.C., New York City, New York, U.S.	
54	Draw	29–6–16 (3)	Frank Patterson	PTS	25	Jul 10, 1899	28 years, 126 days	Coney Island A.C., New York City, New York, U.S.	
53	Draw	29–6–15 (3)	Frank Patterson	PTS	20	May 20, 1899	28 years, 75 days	Greenwood A.C., New York City, New York, U.S.	
52	Loss	29–6–14 (3)	Oscar Gardner	KO	6 (25)	Feb 7, 1899	27 years, 338 days	Lenox A.C., New York City, New York, U.S.	Featherweight Championship of America
51	Loss	29–5–14 (3)	Dave Sullivan	TKO	5 (25)	Sep 26, 1898	27 years, 204 days	Greater New York A.C., New York City, New York, U.S.	Lost world featherweight title
50	Draw	29–4–14 (3)	Tommy White	PTS	25	Aug 1, 1898	27 years, 148 days	Greater New York A.C., New York City, New York, U.S.	Retained world featherweight title
49	Win	29–4–13 (3)	Billy O'Donnell	DQ	7 (20)	Jul 7, 1898	27 years, 123 days	Olympic A.C., Buffalo, New York, U.S.	Retained world featherweight title
48	Draw	28–4–13 (3)	Eddie Santry	PTS	6	Apr 18, 1898	27 years, 43 days	Tattersall's, Chicago, Illinois, U.S.	
47	Win	28–4–12 (3)	George Dixon	PTS	20	Oct 4, 1897	26 years, 212 days	Woodward's Pavilion, San Francisco, California, U.S.	Won world featherweight title
46	Win	27–4–12 (3)	Johnny Griffin	KO	7 (20)	Aug 20, 1897	26 years, 167 days	Woodward's Pavilion, San Francisco, California, U.S.	
45	Win	26–4–12 (3)	Martin Flaherty	PTS	25	May 4, 1897	26 years, 59 days	Broadway A.C., New York City, New York, U.S.	
44	Win	25–4–12 (3)	Oscar Gardner	PTS	20	Mar 13, 1897	26 years, 7 days	Broadway A.C., New York City, New York, U.S.	
43	Draw	24–4–12 (3)	Tommy White	PTS	25	Jan 12, 1897	25 years, 312 days	Bohemian Sporting Club, New York City, New York, U.S.	
42	Win	24–4–11 (3)	Willie Smith	TKO	8 (20)	Nov 9, 1896	25 years, 248 days	National Sporting Club, Covent Garden, London, England, U.K.	Billed world 118lbs title
41	Draw	23–4–11 (3)	Johnny Lavack	PTS	10	Jun 30, 1896	25 years, 116 days	Red Cross Rink, Cleveland, Ohio, U.S.	
40	Win	23–4–10 (3)	Frank Patterson	PTS	10	Jun 22, 1896	25 years, 108 days	Eastern A.C., New York City, New York, U.S.	
39	Draw	22–4–10 (3)	Dolly Lyons	PTS	10	Jun 1, 1896	25 years, 87 days	South Brooklyn A.C., New York City, New York, U.S.	
38	Win	22–4–9 (3)	Jerry Barnett	TKO	5 (6)	Mar 21, 1896	25 years, 15 days	Grand Central Palace, New York City, New York, U.S.	Police intervened
37	Draw	21–4–9 (3)	Johnny Lavack	PTS	15	Feb 22, 1896	24 years, 353 days	West Newton Street Armory, Boston, Massachusetts, U.S.	
36	Win	21–4–8 (3)	Torpedo Billy Murphy	TKO	14 (20)	Dec 23, 1895	24 years, 292 days	Olympic Club, New Orleans, Louisiana, U.S.	Police intervened
35	Win	20–4–8 (3)	George Siddons	UD	8	May 15, 1895	24 years, 70 days	Manhattan A.C., New York City, New York, U.S.	
34	Win	19–4–8 (3)	Jack Mullen	PTS	6	Apr 11, 1895	24 years, 36 days	Leland Opera House, Albany, New York, U.S.	
33	ND	18–4–8 (3)	Jerome Quigley	ND	4	Mar 22, 1895	24 years, 16 days	Philadelphia, Pennsylvania, U.S.	
32	ND	18–4–8 (2)	Billy McCarthy	ND	4	Mar 16, 1895	24 years, 10 days	Philadelphia, Pennsylvania, U.S.	
31	Draw	18–4–8 (1)	Tom Denny	PTS	10	Mar 4, 1895	23 years, 363 days	Seaside A.C., Coney Island, New York, U.S.	
30	Loss	18–4–7 (1)	Oscar Gardner	DQ	5 (15)	Nov 27, 1894	23 years, 266 days	Buffalo A.C., Buffalo, New York, U.S.	Smith was DQ'd for punching Gardner while he was down
29	Draw	18–3–7 (1)	Johnny Van Heest	PTS	15	Oct 26, 1894	23 years, 234 days	Buffalo A.C., Buffalo, New York, U.S.	
28	Draw	18–3–6 (1)	Frank Erne	PTS	10	Oct 2, 1894	23 years, 210 days	Liedertafel Hall, Buffalo, New York, U.S.	
27	Draw	18–3–5 (1)	George "Kid" Lavigne	PTS	8	Mar 7, 1894	23 years, 1 day	Arbeiter Hall, Saginaw, Michigan, U.S.	Pre-arranged draw if lasting the distance
26	Draw	18–3–4 (1)	Young Griffo	PTS	6	Jan 3, 1894	22 years, 303 days	Tivoli Theater, Chicago, Illinois, U.S.	
25	Win	18–3–3 (1)	Dan Ryan	DQ	4 (6)	Dec 1, 1893	22 years, 270 days	Tivoli Theater, Chicago, Illinois, U.S.	
24	Win	17–3–3 (1)	Jimmy Murphy	KO	2 (6)	Nov 13, 1893	22 years, 252 days	Tattersall's, Chicago, Illinois, U.S.	
23	Loss	16–3–3 (1)	George Dixon	TKO	7 (?)	Sep 25, 1893	22 years, 203 days	Coney Island A.C., New York City, New York, U.S.	Lost world featherweight title claim; For world featherweight title
22	Win	16–2–3 (1)	Johnny Griffin	KO	4 (?)	Jul 10, 1893	22 years, 126 days	Columbian Athletic Club, Roby, Indiana, U.S.	Won world featherweight title claim
21	Loss	15–2–3 (1)	Oscar Gardner	KO	6 (?)	Jun 10, 1893	22 years, 96 days	Minneapolis, Minnesota, U.S.	
20	Loss	15–1–3 (1)	Oscar Gardner	PTS	6	May 8, 1893	22 years, 63 days	Phoenix A.C., Saint Paul, Minnesota, U.S.	
19	Win	15–0–3 (1)	Frankie McHugh	NWS	6	Apr 15, 1893	22 years, 40 days	2nd Regiment Armory, Chicago, Illinois, U.S.	
18	Win	14–0–3 (1)	Johnny Van Heest	KO	14 (?)	Dec 29, 1892	21 years, 298 days	California A.C., San Francisco, California, U.S.	
17	Draw	13–0–3 (1)	George Siddons	PTS	56 (?)	Sep 29, 1892	21 years, 207 days	California A.C., San Francisco, California, U.S.	
16	Win	13–0–2 (1)	Dan Daly	KO	3 (?)	Jul 8, 1892	21 years, 124 days	Pacific A.C., San Francisco, California, U.S.	
15	Win	12–0–2 (1)	Dal Hawkins	KO	13	May 24, 1892	21 years, 79 days	California A.C., San Francisco, California, U.S.	A finish fight
14	Win	11–0–2 (1)	Harry Dally	PTS	4	Mar 30, 1892	21 years, 24 days	California A.C., San Francisco, California, U.S.	
13	Win	10–0–2 (1)	Tommy Smith	KO	2 (?)	Feb 25, 1892	20 years, 356 days	New Cribb A.C., Los Angeles, California, U.S.	
12	Win	9–0–2 (1)	Danny Mahoney	KO	15 (?)	Dec 3, 1891	20 years, 272 days	Pastime A.C., Los Angeles, California, U.S.	Won vacant featherweight Championship of the Coast
11	Win	8–0–2 (1)	Billy Manning	KO	6 (?)	Aug 27, 1891	20 years, 174 days	Pastime A.C., Los Angeles, California, U.S.	Won vacant bantamweight championship of Southern California
10	Draw	7–0–2 (1)	Dave Williams	PTS	10	Sep 3, 1890	19 years, 181 days	Pasadena, California, U.S.	
9	Win	7–0–1 (1)	Young Abbott	PTS	4	Dec 5, 1889	18 years, 274 days	Los Angeles, California, U.S.	Exact date unknown
8	Win	6–0–1 (1)	Billy Jones	TKO	13 (?)	Dec 1, 1889	18 years, 270 days	Los Angeles, California, U.S.	Exact date unknown
7	Win	5–0–1 (1)	Pete Cummings	TKO	1 (?)	Nov 1, 1889	18 years, 240 days	Los Angeles, California, U.S.	
6	Win	4–0–1 (1)	Young Billy Moore	TKO	5 (?)	Oct 1, 1889	18 years, 209 days	Los Angeles, California, U.S.	Exact date unknown
5	Win	3–0–1 (1)	Young Billy Moore	PTS	?	Sep 1, 1889	18 years, 179 days	Los Angeles, California, U.S.	Exact date and decision unknown
4	Win	2–0–1 (1)	Jack Golden	KO	2 (?)	Jun 1, 1889	18 years, 87 days	Los Angeles, California, U.S.	
3	NC	1–0–1 (1)	Joe 'Kid' Hogan	NC	29 (?)	Dec 12, 1888	17 years, 281 days	Sacramento, California, U.S.	LA Times Feb 25, 1892 reported this as 32-round draw
2	Draw	1–0–1	Joe Soto	PTS	6	Aug 1, 1888	17 years, 148 days	Los Angeles, California, U.S.	Exact date unknown
1	Win	1–0	Billy Smith	TKO	7 (?)	Jul 1, 1888	17 years, 117 days	Los Angeles, California, U.S.	Professional debut(?); Exact date unknown; Not to be confused with Mysterious Billy Smith

== See also ==
- List of Mexican boxing world champions
- List of world featherweight boxing champions

Achievements
Preceded by George Dixon	World Featherweight Champion; 4 October 1897– 26 September 1898	Succeeded by Dave Sullivan
