= Joe Bernstein (boxer) =

American boxer (1877–1931)

Personal information
- Nicknames: Pride of the Ghetto; Pride of the Bowery
- Nationality: American (United States)
- Born: Youselle Bernstein; November 7, 1877 New York City, Lower East Side
- Died: January 21, 1930 (aged 52) New York City
- Weight: Featherweight

Boxing career
- Stance: Orthodox

Boxing record
- Total fights: 85
- Wins: 28
- Win by KO: 7
- Losses: 29
- Draws: 27
- No contests: 1

Featherweight Joe Bernstein (November 7, 1877 – 1931) was one of the first great boxers to emerge from New York's Lower East Side. He fought for the featherweight championship three times, but lost all three bouts, often in close matches. Nicknamed "The Pride of the Ghetto" in the 1890s, his championship fights endeared him to newly arriving Jewish immigrants.

== Career highlights ==
Bernstein began fighting professionally at only sixteen in 1894. On July 27, 1896, he met Dolly Lyons, a well known Jewish Bantamweight and Featherweight in an eight-round draw at the Palm Athletic Club in New York. Bernstein would take on Lyons twice more, beating him in a twenty-round decision in Brooklyn in March 1899 in what was likely a large audience. The March, 1899 bout with Bernstein is considered Lyons's last recorded fight. Lyons had previously fought Maxey Haugh in front of a crowd of 25,000 in May 1896 in Coney Island. Going against a well known Jewish boxer from Brooklyn who could draw such impressive crowds brought Bernstein to the attention of a large Jewish audience early in his career.

David Stewart, alderman, married Bernstein and Annie Morris, an entertainer, in Brooklyn's City Hall on May 14, 1898.

=== First world featherweight title match ===
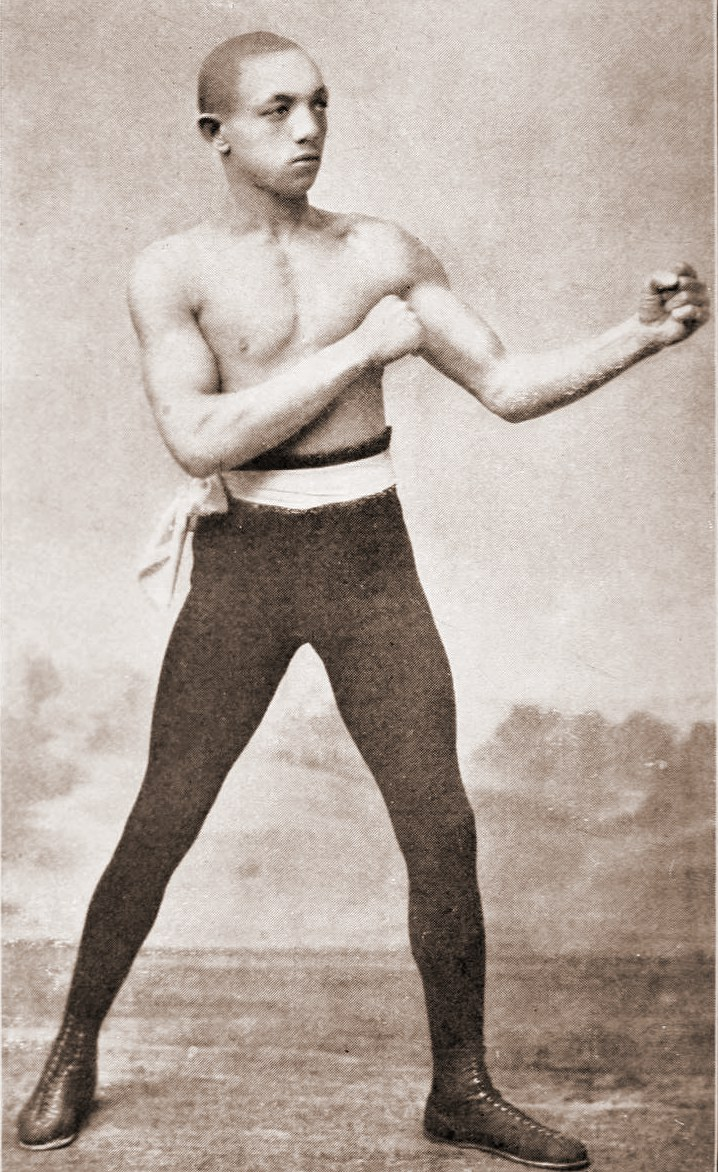
George Dixon, World Featherweight Champion Nov. 98-Jan. 99

Bernstein eventually fought the best men in his division. His first Featherweight Title match went a full twenty five rounds with Featherweight Champion and Hall of Famer George Dixon. It took place on June 2, 1899, at the Broadway Athletic Club in Brooklyn. Bernstein lost in a grueling match.

Dixon had just taken the Featherweight title from Dave Sullivan on November 11, 1898. He held it until January 1900. Bernstein had previously boxed Dixon to a six-round no decision on September 15, 1898, in Philadelphia shortly before Dixon had retaken the title.

=== Second world featherweight title match ===
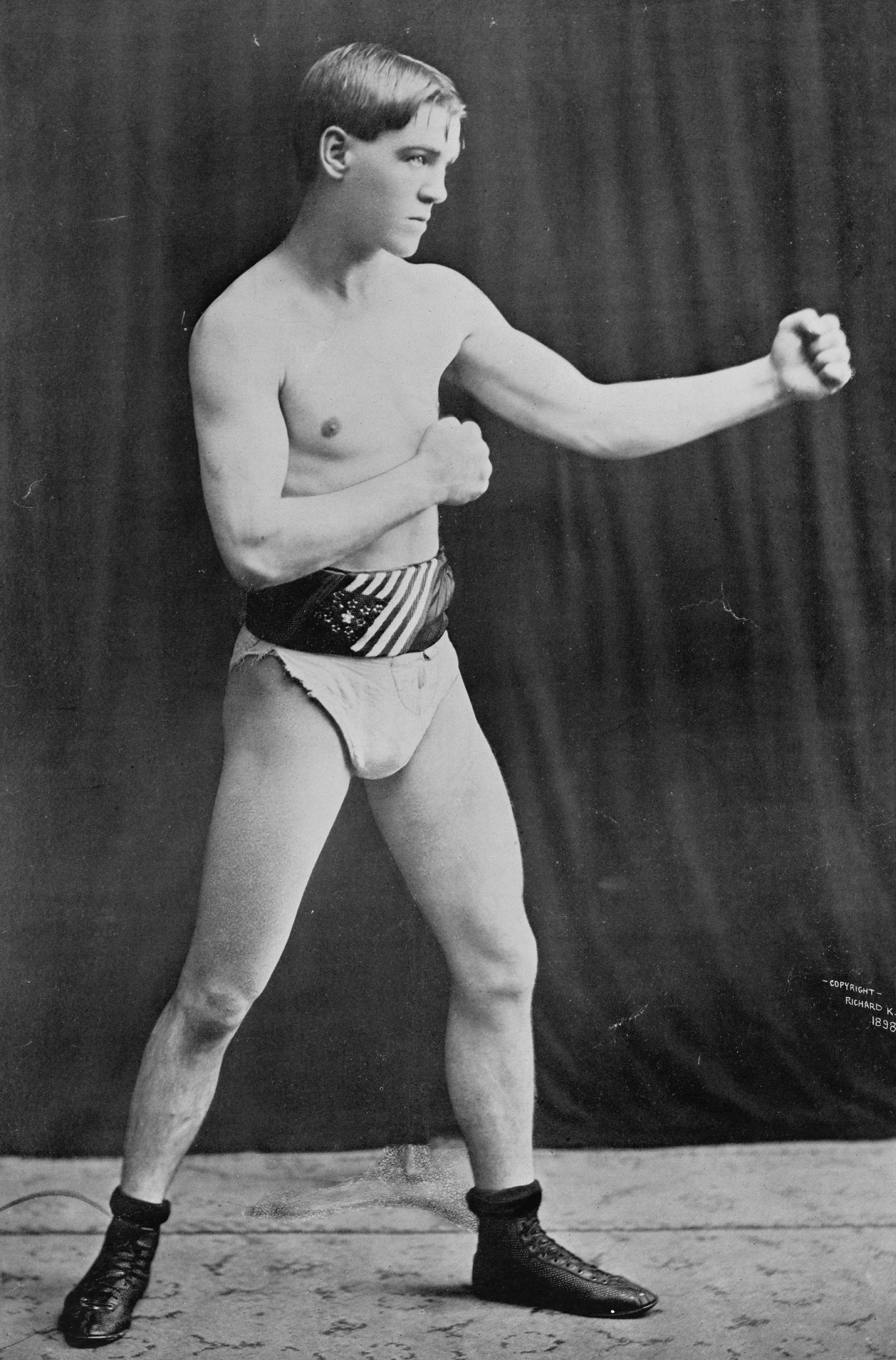
Terry McGovern

The 23-year-old Bernstein had another shot at the title after defeating former champ Solly Smith twice in New York, once by knockout. This time, on November 2, 1900, he battled the legendary Featherweight ChampionTerry McGovern. In his second attempt at the title, Bernstein was knocked out in the seventh round in Louisville, Kentucky

Bernstein fought the exceptional boxer Benny Yanger, one of the few featherweights to ever beat Featherweight champion Abe Attell. Bernstein lost to Yanger on December 18, 1901, in six rounds in Chicago. He lost to Yanger again in six rounds in Chicago on February 10, 1902. Two months later, Yanger beat Attell on April 24, 1902, in a very rough nineteenth-round TKO in St Louis but was never given the title, though the bout was advertised as a Featherweight championship by some sources.

=== Last world feathwerweight title match ===
On October 16, 1902, Bernstein had his third and final World Featherweight Title match with Young Corbett II. Bernstein was unable to continue fighting at the Eureka Athletic Club in Baltimore in the seventh round, and therefore lost the match by technical knockout. The Butte intermountain noted the fight was before a sizable crowd of 3000, and that "there is little doubt that Bernstein would have been able to stay the limit but for the fact that in the seventh round he sustained a broken bone in his left hand." Noting the closeness of the fight the Inter Mountain also wrote, "It is likely the bout would have been declared a draw had it gone the limit."

== End of boxing career and retirement ==
Like many boxers of his era, Bernstein wrestled on occasion as well, possibly more frequently near the end of his boxing career. Washington D.C.'s Evening Star noted that Bernstein failed to throw Walter Lovelace for a fifty dollar purse at the Empire Theatre on November 6, 1902. The bout was just a month after his last shot for the Featherweight Crown with Young Corbett II. He had previously wrestled in D.C. with a Young Muldoon on October 23 and had contracted to wrestle in San Francisco on November 5, 1901.

Bernstein fought from 1902 to 1908 without another title shot. On February 6, 1903, in Philadelphia, he faced Young Corbett II for the third and last time. Young Corbett had been out of the ring for a year. Though winning the bout, Corbett was unable to knockout the determined Bernstein.

Bernstein died of cancer in New York on January 21, 1930, at only 52.

Ruby Goldstein, another great Jewish Boxer who was honored to be given a similar nickname, "The Jewel of the Ghetto," wrote "Bernstein remained a figure in our folklore and a name that even bearded patriarchs who had never seen a fight...and who couldn't have named the name of another fighter, still spoke of." Partly as a tribute to Bernstein, novelist Peter Levine wrote that Eastern European Jewish immigrants who flooded into America during this period, "came out to cheer on their landsmen...and enjoy a sense of independence and freedom in a...male world that combined fierce ethnic loyalties in praise of athletes that personified both ethnic pride and...the importance of individual effort, hard work, discipline, and competition as the keys to succeeding as Americans."
