= Thomas Raymond Kelly =

Thomas Raymond Kelly may refer to:

- Thomas Kelly (sailor) (1928–1947), British Merchant Navy seaman and George Cross recipient
- Thomas Raymond Kelly (Quaker mystic) (1893–1941), American Quaker educator
- Red Kelly (musician) (1927–2004), American jazz double-bassist

== See also ==
- Thomas Kelly (disambiguation)
