= Thomas Kelly =

Thomas, Tom, or Tommy Kelly may refer to:

== Entertainment ==
- Tommy Kelly (actor) (1925–2016), American actor in The Adventures of Tom Sawyer
- Tom Kelly (musician) (born 1946), American musician and songwriter
- "Shotgun Tom" Kelly (born 1949), American radio and television personality
- Thomas Vincent Kelly (active 1996–2009), American film and television actor
- Tom Kelly (actor), British television actor
- Thomas Kelly (pianist), British pianist, prize-winner in 2021 Leeds International Piano Competition
- T. C. Kelly (Thomas Christopher Kelly, 1917–1985), Irish composer, teacher and conductor
- Red Kelly (musician) (Thomas Raymond Kelly, 1927–2004), American jazz double-bassist

== Military ==
- Thomas Kelly-Kenny (1840–1914), Irish-born British general, born Thomas Kelly
- Thomas Kelly (sailor) (1928–1947), British Merchant Navy seaman and George Cross recipient
- Thomas Kelly (Medal of Honor, 1898) (died 1920), U.S. Army soldier and Medal of Honor recipient during the Spanish–American War
- Thomas Kelly (Medal of Honor, 1864) (1837–?), Irish-born soldier in the Union Army
- Thomas J. Kelly (Medal of Honor) (1923–1988), U.S. Army soldier and Medal of Honor recipient during World War II
- Thomas W. Kelly (1932–2000), U.S. Army lieutenant general and Gulf War Pentagon spokesman

== Politics ==
- Thomas Kelly (politician, born 1723) (1723–1809), Irish barrister, judge and politician
- Thomas J. Kelly (Irish nationalist) (1833–1908), Irish revolutionary and leader of the Irish Republican Brotherhood
- Thomas Kelly (Sinn Féin politician) (1868–1942), Irish Sinn Féin and later Fianna Fáil politician
- Thomas Kelly (Canadian politician) (1833–1893), Canadian lawyer, judge and politician in Prince Edward Island
- Thomas Kelly (New Zealand politician) (1830–1921), member of parliament in Taranaki, New Zealand
- Tom Kelly (SDLP politician), former vice chairman of the Social Democratic and Labour Party in Northern Ireland
- Tom Kelly (Wyoming politician), state representative

== Religion ==
- Thomas Kelly (hymn-writer) (1769–1855) Irish evangelical, founder of the Kellyites
- Thomas Kelly (archbishop of Armagh) (1781–1835), Irish prelate of the Roman Catholic Church
- Thomas Raymond Kelly (Quaker mystic) (1893–1941), American Quaker educator
- Thomas C. Kelly (1931–2011), archbishop of Louisville

== Sports ==
=== Football and rugby ===
- Thomas Kelly (rugby union) (1882–1959), England
- Tom Kelly (footballer, born 1885) (1885–1916), English professional footballer
- Tom Kelly (footballer, born 1919) (1919–1970), English professional footballer
- Tom Kelly (footballer, born 1964) (born 1964), Scottish professional footballer
- Tommy Kelly (footballer) (active 1966–1982), Irish
- Tom Kelly (Gaelic footballer) (active 1999–2010), former Gaelic football player
- Thomas Kelly (footballer, fl. 1900s), English footballer for Sunderland
- Thomas Kelly (footballer, born 1902) (1902–1979), English footballer for Barnsley and Wigan Borough
- Tommy Kelly (American football) (born 1980), American football player for the New England Patriots

=== Other sports ===
- Thomas Kelly (cricketer, born 1844) (1844–1893), Australian cricketer
- Thomas Kelly (cricketer, born 2000), Australian cricketer
- Tom Kelly (basketball) (1924–2008), American engineer and professional basketball player
- Thomas Joseph Kelly (1919–2013), American trainer of Thoroughbred racehorses
- Tom Kelly (baseball) (born 1950), manager of the Minnesota Twins
- Tommy Spider Kelly (1867–1927), American boxer
- Toss Kelly (Thomas B. Kelly, 1862–1924), American baseball umpire

== Other ==
- Thomas J. Kelly (aerospace engineer) (1929–2002), American aerospace engineer
- Thomas J. Kelly (scientist) (born 1941), American cancer researcher
- Thomas Forrest Kelly (born 1943), American musicologist
- Thomas J. Kelly III (born 1947), American photojournalist
- Thomas Kelly (1994–2012), Australian assault victim, see Death of Thomas Kelly
- Thomas P. Kelly III, American diplomat
- Thomas Kelly, one of the perpetrators of the Maungatapu murders

== See also ==
- Thomas Kelley (disambiguation)
- Thomas Kelly High School (opened 1928), American school in Chicago
