= Mitchell Depot Historical Museum =

History museum in Mitchell, Georgia, USA

Coordinates: 33.2188°N 82.70371°W

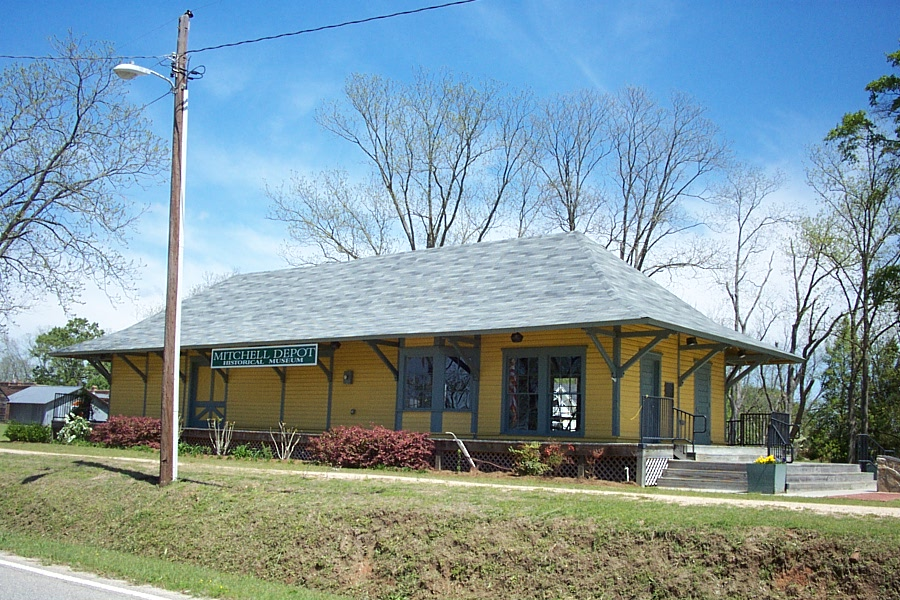
Mitchell's former railroad depot, now the Mitchell Depot Historical Museum, located along Georgia Highway 102 in downtown Mitchell.

Mitchell Depot Historical Museum is located in Mitchell, Georgia, Glascock County, Georgia in the United States. The former railroad depot is now a museum located along Georgia Highway 102 in downtown Mitchell. It was a station on the Augusta Southern Railroad.

== See also ==
- National Register of Historic Places listings in Glascock County, Georgia

Preceding station	Southern Railway	Following station
Agricola toward Tennille	Augusta Southern Railroad	Belle Springs toward Augusta
