= Thomas Kelley =

Thomas or Tom Kelley may refer to:

== Sports ==
- Thomas Kelley (coach) (c. 1888–after 1922), American football and basketball coach
- Tom Kelley (American football), American football coach at Framingham State University
- Tom Kelley (baseball) (1944–2015), American baseball player

== Others ==
- Thomas G. Kelley (born 1939), American naval officer
  - USS Thomas G. Kelley, an Arleigh Burke-class destroyer of the United States Navy
- T. J. M. Kelley (Thomas Jefferson Marion Kelley Sr., 1855–1912), American physician and politician
- Thomas P. Kelley (1905–1982), Canadian writer of pulp fiction
- Tom Kelley (photographer) (1914–1984), American celebrity photographer

== See also ==
- Thomas Kelly (disambiguation)
- Kelley (name)
