= Augusta, Gibson and Sandersville Railroad =

Railroad in Georgia, United States

The Augusta, Gibson and Sandersville Railroad was incorporated in 1884 and began operating from Augusta to Gibson and Sandersville, Georgia, in 1885 and 1886, respectively. In 1893, it went bankrupt and was reorganized as the Augusta Southern Railroad. The line ran as 3 ft (914 mm) narrow gauge until 1895.
