= Glascock County Courthouse =

- U.S. National Register of Historic Places
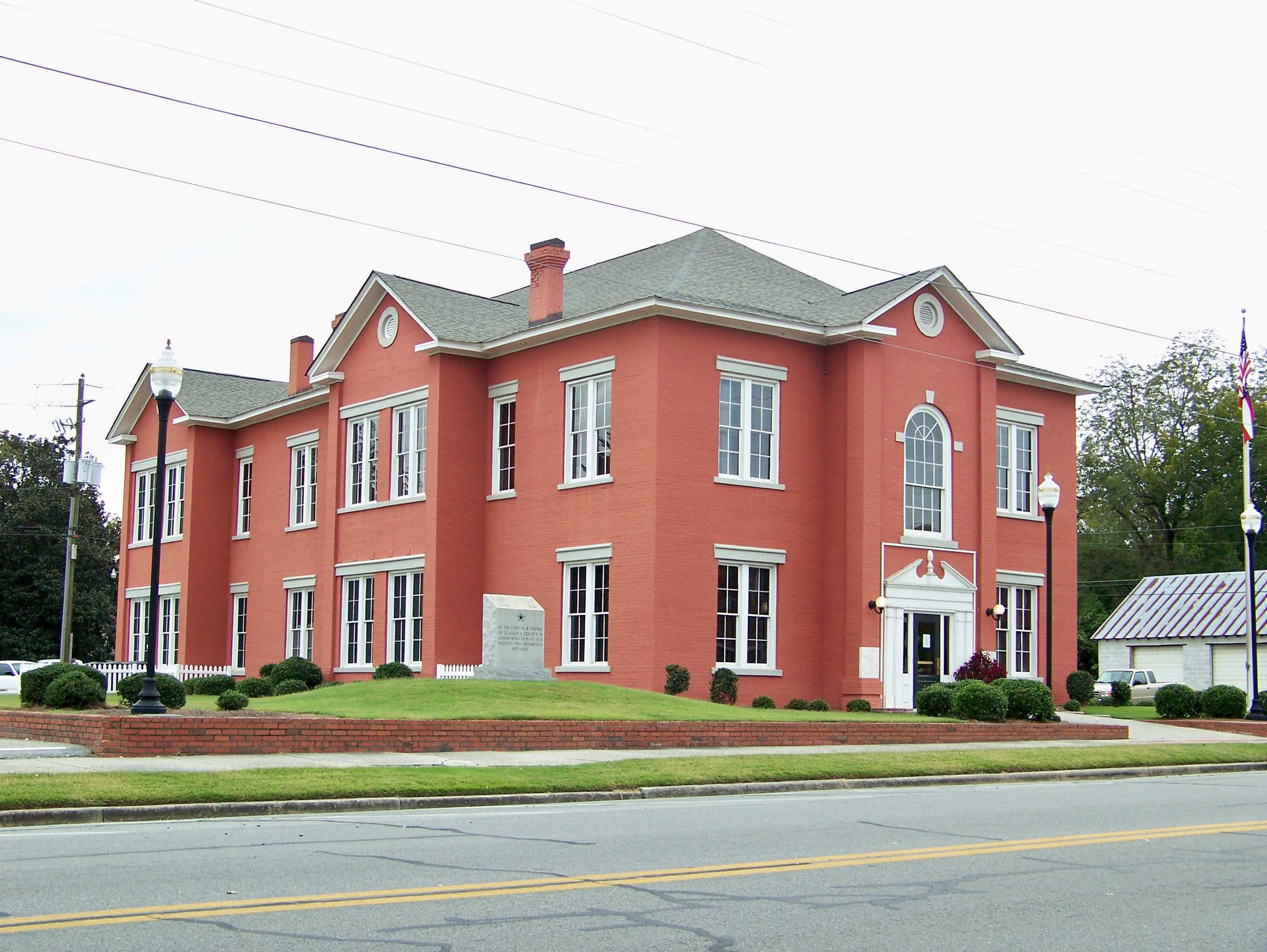

- Location within Georgia Location within the United States
- Location: Main St., Gibson, Georgia
- Coordinates: 33°13′59″N 82°35′42″W
- Area: 2 acres (0.81 ha)
- Built: 1918
- Architectural style: Classical Revival
- MPS: Georgia County Courthouses TR
- NRHP reference No.: 80001082
- Added to NRHP: September 18, 1980

Glascock County Courthouse is a courthouse on Main Street in Gibson, Georgia, the county seat of Glascock County. The first county courthouse was built in 1858 with a donation from William Gibson, namesake of the county seat. It was removed for use as a residence when the currently used courthouse was built in 1919. The courthouse was designed by J.W. McMillian & Son. It was added to the National Register of Historic Places on September 18, 1980.

== See also ==
- National Register of Historic Places listings in Glascock County, Georgia
