= George Dixon (boxer) =

Canadian boxer (1870–1908)

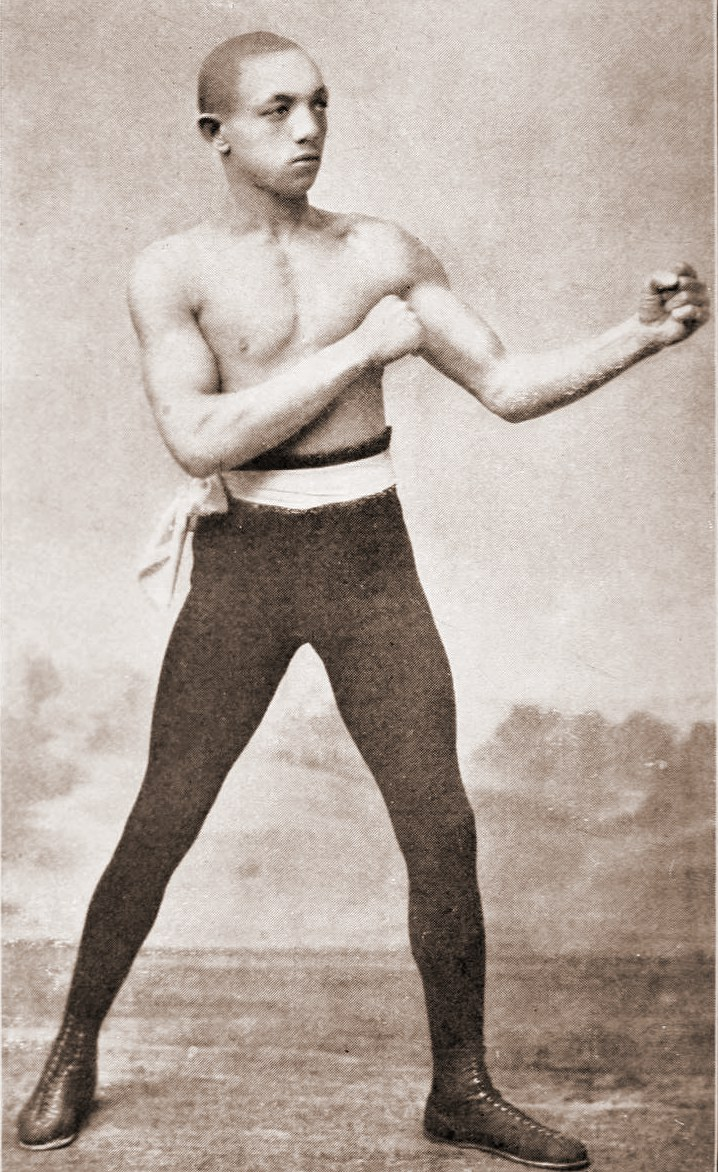
- Dixon, c. 1894

Personal information
- Nickname: Little Chocolate
- Born: July 29, 1870 Africville, Halifax, Nova Scotia, Canada
- Died: January 6, 1908 (aged 37) New York City, New York, U.S.
- Height: 5 ft 3 1/2 in (161 cm)
- Weight: Bantamweight; Featherweight

Boxing career
- Reach: 66 in (168 cm)
- Stance: Orthodox

Boxing record
- Total fights: 163
- Wins: 74
- Win by KO: 36
- Losses: 30
- Draws: 55
- No contests: 6

George Dixon (July 29, 1870 – January 6, 1908) was a Canadian professional boxer. He became the first ever black athlete to win a world championship in any sport and was also the first Canadian-born boxing champion when he won the bantamweight title in 1890. He also captured the featherweight championship of the world twice to become the first 3x world champion in history and the first boxer to win world titles in more than one weight class. Ring Magazine founder Nat Fleischer ranked Dixon as the #1 featherweight of all time. He was inducted into Canada's Sports Hall of Fame in 1955, the Ring Magazine Hall of Fame in 1956 and the International Boxing Hall of Fame as a first-class inductee in 1990. In 2018 he was named one of the greatest 15 athletes in Nova Scotia's history, ranking sixth.

== Boxing career ==
Dixon was born in Africville, Halifax, Nova Scotia. Known as "Little Chocolate" or as "George Tropicana" he stood 5 feet 3.5 inches (1.613 m) tall and weighed only 87 pounds (39 kg) when he began his professional boxing career. Dixon is widely credited for developing shadowboxing.

Dixon claimed the world bantamweight title on May 10, 1888, after a bout with Tommy "Spider" Kelly, and was officially considered the champion after knocking out Nunc Wallace of England in 18 rounds two years later on June 27, 1890.

On May 31, 1891, Dixon retained his bantamweight crown by beating Cal McCarthy in 22 rounds and then moved up to the featherweight division where he won the World title by beating England's Fred Johnson on June 27, 1892. While he held the title, Dixon established a vaudeville troupe he called the "George Dixon Specialty Co." which toured Canada and the United States; it appeared at the Naylor Opera House in Terre Haute, Indiana, on November 8, 1894.

On October 4, 1897, he lost the featherweight title by decision in a rematch bout with Solly Smith, who he had previously defeated by seventh-round technical knockout.

In a close bout, he lost to the British featherweight champion Ben Jordan on July 1, 1898, at New York's Lenox Club in a classic twenty five round points decision by referee Charley White. According to the San Francisco Chronicle, "Dixon did the leading but unlike many of those who had previously met the little Colored fighter, Jordan went at him and mixed it all the time." The bout was close, and many believed a draw would have been a better decision. Jordan was down on his hands and knees in the seventh from a blow by Dixon, but the bout contained relatively few knockdowns and no counts. The bout ended with a flurry by Dixon, but the referee did not feel it adequate to award him the decision. The Chronicle actually believed Dixon had the edge in the fighting. The Los Angeles Times also agreed the bout was close and that "Both men fought well and there was little to choose between them".

Dixon was in talks to face champion Solly Smith in a third meeting, however, Smith lost the world title in a surprising upset against Dave Sullivan – the bout was stopped in the fifth round after Smith sustained a broken arm. Dixon instead turned his attention to newly crowned champion Sullivan, and on November 11, 1898, he reclaimed the world featherweight title by decisively defeating him in a tenth round disqualification at New York City's Lenox Club. Sullivan had held the title only forty-six days.

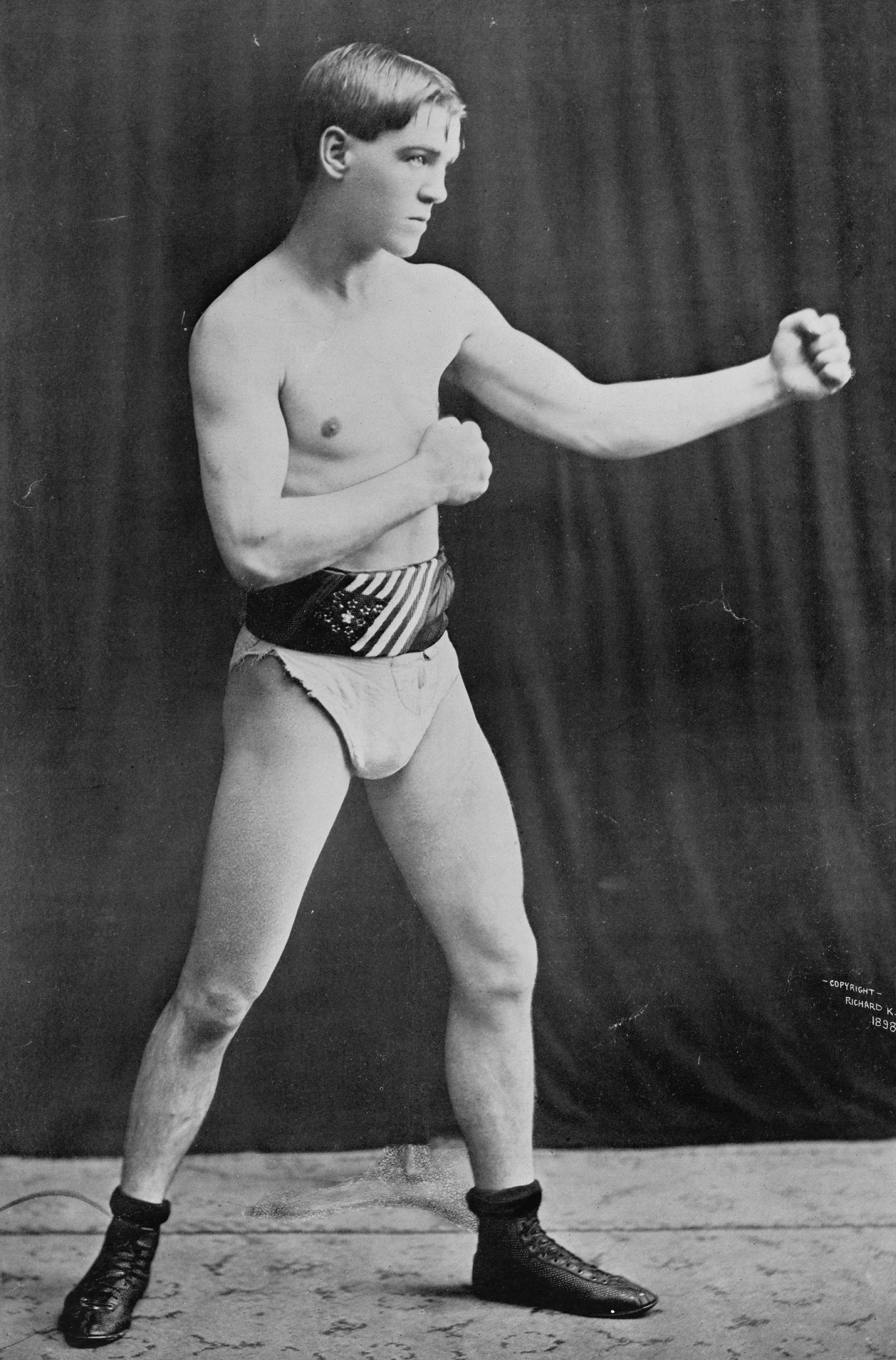
Terry McGovern

At the time of the fight the betting favored Dixon, but was close, and briefly went to even odds. For nine rounds in front of eight thousand spectators, Dixon had the advantage.

In the final round, Sullivan's brother Jack walked into the ring twice to speak to the referee, Jimmy Coville, about the time remaining in the round, eventually causing Coville to end the fight in frustration over Jack's infraction. Sullivan could have fought on, though he would have almost certainly lost the fight.

According to some sources, Dixon lost his featherweight title in a 15-round decision to Abe Attell on October 28, 1901, while other sources credit his loss of the title to "Terrible" Terry McGovern almost 2 years prior on January 9, 1900.

By that time, he had moved to Boston, where he had family; it was a destination for other immigrants from Africville.

Dixon died on January 6, 1908, not long after his last fight, in the alcohol ward of Bellevue Hospital. Dixon was living and begging on the streets of New York. Attempts by Dixon's fans to get him back on his feet failed and the media reported the end was near for the former champion who had fallen on dark times. When asked if he had friends who could help, Dixon would tell doctors he had no friends except for former world heavyweight champion John L. Sullivan.

Part of his hospital bills for the illness that took his life were paid for by a charity boxing tournament that took place on January 23, 1908, at Bower's Minery Theatre in New York. He is interred in the Mount Hope Cemetery in Boston, Massachusetts. A recreation and community centre adjacent Uniacke Square in Halifax is named in his honour. In 2021, Dixon was named a National Historic Person by the government of Canada, on the recommendation of the National Historic Sites and Monuments Board. The commemorative plaque is located at Africville Museum, Halifax, Nova Scotia.

== Professional boxing record ==
All information in this section is derived from BoxRec, unless otherwise stated.

=== Official record ===
140 fights	32 wins	30 losses
By knockout	0	6
By decision	29	23
By disqualification	3	1
Draws	57	
No contests	8	
Newspaper decisions/draws	13	

All newspaper decisions are officially regarded as “no decision” bouts and are not counted as a win, loss or draw.

No.	Result	Record	Opponent	Type	Round	Date	Location	Notes
176	Loss	68–30–57 (21)	Monk The Newsboy	PTS	15	Dec 10, 1906	Standard A.C., Lymansville, Rhode Island, U.S.	
175	Draw	68–29–57 (21)	Billy Ryan	PTS	12	May 21, 1906	Gloucester A.C., Gloucester, Massachusetts, U.S.	
174	Draw	68–29–56 (21)	Patsy Haley	NWS	3	Jan 16, 1906	Cayler A.C., Brooklyn, New York City, New York, U.S.	
173	Win	68–29–56 (20)	Harry Shea	KO	3 (?)	Jan 4, 1906	Roman A.C., New York City, New York, U.S.	
172	Win	67–29–56 (20)	Frank Howe	NWS	3	Dec 28, 1905	Long Acre A.C., New York City, New York, U.S.	
171	Loss	67–29–56 (19)	Harlem Tommy Murphy	KO	2 (6)	Sep 20, 1905	National A.C., Philadelphia, Pennsylvania, U.S.	
170	Draw	67–28–56 (19)	Joe Goodwin	PTS	10	Jun 26, 1905	Labour Hall, Manchester, Lancashire, England	
169	Win	67–28–55 (19)	Alf Wood	PTS	8	Jun 8, 1905	Cosmopolitan Sporting Club, Marylebone, London, England	
168	Draw	66–28–55 (19)	Dick Nelson	PTS	10	May 28, 1905	Copenhagen, Denmark	
167	Draw	66–28–54 (19)	Bob White	PTS	6	Apr 17, 1905	Corn Exchange, Bedford, Bedfordshire, England	
166	Draw	66–28–53 (19)	Darkey Haley	PTS	6	Apr 15, 1905	Wonderland, Whitechapel Road, Mile End, London, England	
165	Draw	66–28–52 (19)	Jack Foy	PTS	15	Apr 6, 1905	Cosmopolitan Sporting Club, Marylebone, London, England	
164	NC	66–28–51 (19)	Jim Keith	ND	3	Apr 1, 1905	Waverley Market, Edinburgh, Scotland	No decision trial bout
163	Draw	66–28–51 (18)	Cockney Cohen	PTS	20	Mar 6, 1905	Norfolk Drill Hall, Sheffield, Yorkshire, England	Billed English 8st 8lbs title
162	Win	66–28–50 (18)	Stoker Stoodley	TKO	5 (20)	Feb 25, 1905	Volunteer Engineers Drill Hall, Portsmouth, Hampshire, England	
161	Draw	65–28–50 (18)	Darkey Haley	PTS	6	Feb 18, 1905	Wonderland, Whitechapel Road, Mile End, London, England	
160	Loss	65–28–49 (18)	Bob White	PTS	6	Jan 30, 1905	Drill Hall, Guildford, Surrey, England	
159	Draw	65–27–49 (18)	Johnny Hughes	PTS	8	Jan 6, 1905	Corn Exchange, Ashford, Kent, England	
158	Draw	65–27–48 (18)	Bob White	PTS	6	Dec 23, 1904	Philharmonic Hall, Southampton, Hampshire, England	
157	Draw	65–27–47 (18)	Boss Edwards	PTS	15	Nov 24, 1904	Cosmopolitan Sporting Club, Marylebone, London, England	
156	Loss	65–27–46 (18)	Owen Moran	PTS	6	Oct 17, 1904	National Sporting Club, Covent Garden, London, England	
155	Loss	65–26–46 (18)	Tommy Burns	PTS	20	Apr 21, 1904	Liverpool Gymnastic Club, Liverpool, Merseyside, England	
154	Draw	65–25–46 (18)	George Moore	PTS	6	Apr 9, 1904	Wonderland, Whitechapel Road, Mile End, London, England	
153	NC	65–25–45 (18)	Spike Robson	NC	11 (20)	Mar 19, 1904	Ginnetts Circus, Newcastle, Tyne and Wear, England	The referee declared a no contest as Robson was suffering from a liver complaint
152	Loss	65–25–45 (17)	Cockney Cohen	PTS	15	Mar 7, 1904	Leeds and County Athletic Club, Leeds, Yorkshire, England	
151	Draw	65–24–45 (17)	Harry Mansfield	PTS	20	Feb 22, 1904	Winter Gardens, Plymouth, Devon, England	
150	Loss	65–24–44 (17)	Jim Driscoll	PTS	6	Feb 10, 1904	Bristol, Avon, England	
149	Draw	65–23–44 (17)	Johnny Summers	PTS	6	Feb 6, 1904	Wonderland, Whitechapel Road, Mile End, London, England	
148	Win	65–23–43 (17)	Cockney Cohen	KO	8 (20)	Jan 16, 1904	Ginnetts Circus, Newcastle, Tyne and Wear, England	Retained world 120lbs title claim
147	Draw	64–23–43 (17)	Dai Morgan	PTS	15	Dec 19, 1903	Ivor Athletic Club, Swansea, Wales	
146	Win	64–23–42 (17)	Cockney Cohen	PTS	20	Dec 7, 1903	Ginnetts Circus, Newcastle, Tyne and Wear, England	Retained world 120lbs title claim
145	Win	63–23–42 (17)	Pedlar Palmer	PTS	20	Nov 9, 1903	Ginnetts Circus, Newcastle, Tyne and Wear, England	Claimed vacant world 120lbs title
144	Draw	62–23–42 (17)	Charlie Lampey	PTS	6	Oct 29, 1903	Public Hall, Barking Road, Canning Town, London, England	
143	Loss	62–23–41 (17)	Digger Stanley	PTS	6	Oct 12, 1903	National Sporting Club, Covent Garden, London, England	
142	Win	62–22–41 (17)	Jim Williams	TKO	4 (6)	Oct 10, 1903	Wonderland, Whitechapel Road, Mile End, London, England	
141	Draw	61–22–41 (17)	Charlie Lampey	PTS	6	Sep 29, 1903	London, England	
140	NC	61–22–40 (17)	Dave Wallace	ND	6	Sep 28, 1903	Pretoria Gymnasium, Birmingham, West Midlands, England	No decision trial bout
139	Draw	61–22–40 (16)	Billy Barrett	PTS	20	Sep 24, 1903	Liverpool Gymnastic Club, Liverpool, England	
138	Draw	61–22–39 (16)	Charlie Lampey	PTS	6	Sep 14, 1903	Wonderland, Whitechapel Road, Mile End, London, England	
137	Win	61–22–38 (16)	Harry Ware	PTS	6	Aug 29, 1903	Wonderland, Whitechapel Road, Mile End, London, England	
136	Win	60–22–38 (16)	Digger Stanley	PTS	6	Aug 1, 1903	Wonderland, Whitechapel Road, Mile End, London, England	
135	Loss	59–22–38 (16)	Pedlar Palmer	PTS	8	Jun 27, 1903	Wonderland, Whitechapel Road, Mile End, London, England	
134	Draw	59–21–38 (16)	'Young' Harry Paul	PTS	6	Jun 15, 1903	Wonderland, Whitechapel Road, Mile End, London, England	
133	Loss	59–21–37 (16)	Jim Driscoll	KO	5 (?)	Jun 1, 1903	Wales	Fight date, time and place not exact -- need source for this bout
132	Draw	59–20–37 (16)	George Phalin	PTS	15	May 25, 1903	Jem Mace's Gymnasium, Birmingham, West Midlands, England	
131	Loss	59–20–36 (16)	Spike Robson	PTS	20	May 16, 1903	Ginnetts Circus, Newcastle, Tyne and Wear, England	
130	Loss	59–19–36 (16)	Ben Jordan	PTS	6	May 2, 1903	Wonderland, Whitechapel Road, Mile End, London, England	
129	Draw	59–18–36 (16)	George Phalin	PTS	15	Apr 16, 1903	Liverpool, Merseyside, England	
128	Loss	59–18–35 (16)	Spike Robson	PTS	15	Apr 11, 1903	Ginnetts Circus, Newcastle, Tyne and Wear, England	
127	Win	59–17–35 (16)	Jack Pearson	KO	8 (?)	Apr 6, 1903	Liverpool, Merseyside, England	
126	Loss	58–17–35 (16)	Fred Delaney	PTS	6	Feb 28, 1903	Beresford Street Drill Hall, Woolwich, London, England	
125	Draw	58–16–35 (16)	Dave Wallace	PTS	6	Feb 20, 1903	Birmingham, West Midlands, England	Exact date unknown
124	Draw	58–16–34 (16)	Harry Ware	PTS	20	Feb 9, 1903	Corn Exchange, Northampton, Northamptonshire, England	Billed world 116lbs title claim
123	Loss	58–16–33 (16)	Jim Driscoll	PTS	8	Jan 24, 1903	Theatre Royal, Cadoxton, Wales	
122	NC	58–15–33 (16)	Jim Courtney	ND	6	Jan 19, 1903	Theater Royale, Cadoxton-Barry, Wales	
121	Win	58–15–33 (15)	Harry Smith	KO	3 (6)	Nov 15, 1902	Canterbury Theatre of Varieties, Lambeth, London, England	
120	Draw	57–15–33 (15)	Will Curley	PTS	15	Sep 29, 1902	Standard Theatre, Gateshead, Tyne and Wear, England	
119	Loss	57–15–32 (15)	Pedlar Palmer	PTS	15	Sep 8, 1902	New National Athletic Club, Marylebone, London, England	
118	Draw	57–14–32 (15)	Tim Callahan	NWS	6	Jun 30, 1902	Golden Gate A.C., Philadelphia, Pennsylvania, U.S.	
117	Loss	57–14–32 (14)	Biz Mackey	TKO	5 (10)	Jun 10, 1902	Business Men's A.C., Findlay, Ohio, U.S.	
116	Draw	57–13–32 (14)	Eddie Lenny	NWS	6	Jun 6, 1902	Armory Hall, Chester, Pennsylvania, U.S.	
115	Loss	57–13–32 (13)	Danny Dougherty	NWS	7	May 27, 1902	Globe A.C., Philadelphia, Pennsylvania, U.S.	
114	Draw	57–13–32 (12)	Billy Ryan	PTS	15	May 16, 1902	Dey's Rink, Ottawa, Ontario, Canada	
113	Win	57–13–31 (12)	Chick Tucker	PTS	20	Feb 13, 1902	National A.C., New Britain, Connecticut, U.S.	
112	Loss	56–13–31 (12)	Eddie Lenny	TKO	9 (20)	Jan 24, 1902	Germania Maennerchor Hall, Baltimore, Maryland, U.S.	
111	Draw	56–12–31 (12)	Joe Tipman	PTS	20	Jan 17, 1902	Germania Maennerchor Hall, Baltimore, Maryland, U.S.	
110	Loss	56–12–30 (12)	Austin Rice	PTS	20	Dec 19, 1901	Opera House, New London, Connecticut, U.S.	
109	Loss	56–11–30 (12)	Abe Attell	PTS	15	Oct 28, 1901	West End A.C., Saint Louis, Missouri, U.S.	
108	Loss	56–10–30 (12)	Benny Yanger	PTS	15	Sep 26, 1901	Saint Louis, Missouri, U.S.	
107	Draw	56–9–30 (12)	Abe Attell	PTS	20	Sep 12, 1901	Grand Opera House, Cripple Creek, Colorado, U.S.	
106	Draw	56–9–29 (12)	Abe Attell	PTS	10	Aug 23, 1901	Coliseum Hall, Denver, Colorado, U.S.	
105	Loss	56–9–28 (12)	Young Corbett II	PTS	10	Aug 16, 1901	Coliseum Hall, Denver, Colorado, U.S.	For Western featherweight championship
104	Draw	56–8–28 (12)	Harry Lyons	PTS	20	Feb 8, 1901	Germania Maennerchor Hall, Baltimore, Maryland, U.S.	
103	Loss	56–8–27 (12)	Tommy Sullivan	TKO	7 (25)	Jul 31, 1901	Seaside A.C., Brooklyn, New York City, New York, U.S.	
102	Loss	56–7–27 (12)	Terry McGovern	PTS	6	Jun 23, 1900	Tattersall's, Chicago, Illinois, U.S.	
101	Draw	56–6–27 (12)	Benny Yanger	PTS	6	Jun 12, 1900	Tattersall's, Chicago, Illinois, U.S.	
100	Loss	56–6–26 (12)	Tim Callahan	NWS	6	Jun 4, 1900	Penn Art Club, Philadelphia, Pennsylvania, U.S.	
99	Loss	56–6–26 (11)	Terry McGovern	TKO	8 (25)	Jan 9, 1900	Broadway A.C., New York City, New York, U.S.	Lost world featherweight title
98	Win	56–5–26 (11)	Eddie Lenny	PTS	25	Nov 21, 1899	Broadway A.C., Brooklyn, New York City, New York, U.S.	Retained world featherweight title
97	Win	55–5–26 (11)	Will Curley	PTS	25	Nov 2, 1899	Broadway A.C., Brooklyn, New York City, New York, U.S.	Retained world featherweight title
96	Win	54–5–26 (11)	Tim Callahan	NWS	6	Oct 13, 1899	Industrial Hall, Philadelphia, Pennsylvania, U.S.	
95	Draw	54–5–26 (10)	Eddie Santry	PTS	20	Aug 11, 1899	Broadway A.C., New York City, New York, U.S.	Retained world featherweight title
94	Win	54–5–25 (10)	Eddie Santry	PTS	6	Jul 14, 1899	Star Theatre, Chicago, Illinois, U.S.	
93	Win	53–5–25 (10)	Tommy White	PTS	20	Jul 11, 1899	Olympic A.C., Denver, Colorado, U.S.	Retained world featherweight title
92	Win	52–5–25 (10)	Sam Bolen	KO	3 (25)	Jul 3, 1899	Music Hall, Louisville, Kentucky, U.S.	Retained world featherweight title
91	Win	51–5–25 (10)	Joe Bernstein	PTS	25	Jun 2, 1899	Broadway A.C., Brooklyn, New York City, New York, U.S.	Retained world featherweight title
90	Win	50–5–25 (10)	Kid Broad	PTS	20	May 15, 1899	Olympic A.C., Buffalo, New York City, New York, U.S.	Retained world featherweight title
89	Win	49–5–25 (10)	Young Pluto	KO	10 (25)	Jan 17, 1899	Lenox A.C., New York City, New York, U.S.	Retained world featherweight title
88	Win	48–5–25 (10)	Oscar Gardner	PTS	25	Nov 29, 1898	Lenox A.C., New York City, New York, U.S.	Retained world featherweight title
87	Win	47–5–25 (10)	Dave Sullivan	DQ	10 (25)	Nov 11, 1898	Lenox A.C., New York City, New York, U.S.	Won world featherweight title
86	Win	46–5–25 (10)	Joe Bernstein	NWS	6	Sep 5, 1898	Arena A.C., Philadelphia, Pennsylvania, U.S.	
85	Win	46–5–25 (9)	Jimmy Dunn	NWS	6	Aug 29, 1898	Casino, Fall River, Massachusetts, U.S.	
84	Loss	46–5–25 (8)	Ben Jordan	PTS	25	Jul 1, 1898	Lenox A.C., New York, New York, U.S.	
83	Win	46–4–25 (8)	Eddie Santry	PTS	20	Jun 6, 1898	Lenox A.C., New York, New York, U.S.	
82	Draw	45–4–25 (8)	Tommy White	PTS	20	Mar 31, 1898	Empire A.C., Syracuse, New York, U.S.	
81	Loss	45–4–24 (8)	Solly Smith	PTS	20	Oct 4, 1897	Mechanic's Pavilion, San Francisco, California, U.S.	Lost world featherweight title
80	Draw	45–3–24 (8)	Dal Hawkins	PTS	20	Jul 23, 1897	Mechanic's Pavilion, San Francisco, California, U.S.	
79	Draw	45–3–23 (8)	Kentucky Rosebud	NWS	6	Jun 21, 1897	Arena, Philadelphia, Pennsylvania, U.S.	
78	Win	45–3–23 (7)	Johnny Griffin	PTS	20	Apr 26, 1897	Broadway A.C., Brooklyn, New York City, New York, U.S.	
77	Win	44–3–23 (7)	Frank Erne	PTS	25	Mar 24, 1897	Broadway A.C., Brooklyn, New York City, New York, U.S.	Won world featherweight title
76	Draw	43–3–23 (7)	Jack Downey	PTS	20	Feb 15, 1897	Broadway A.C., Brooklyn, New York City, New York, U.S.	
75	Win	43–3–22 (7)	Torpedo Billy Murphy	KO	6 (20)	Jan 22, 1897	Broadway A.C., Brooklyn, New York City, New York, U.S.	Billed World 120 lbs Featherweight Title claim
74	Loss	42–3–22 (7)	Frank Erne	PTS	20	Nov 27, 1896	Broadway A.C., New York City, New York, U.S.	Lost world featherweight title; Dixon continued to claim the title despite this title loss
73	Draw	42–2–22 (7)	Tommy White	PTS	20	Sep 25, 1896	Broadway A.C., New York City, New York, U.S.	Retained world featherweight title
72	Draw	42–2–21 (7)	Martin Flaherty	PTS	20	Jun 16, 1896	West Newton Street Armory, Boston, Massachusetts, U.S.	
71	Win	42–2–20 (7)	Charles Slusher	PTS	4 (?)	May 9, 1896	Louisville, Kentucky, U.S.	
70	Win	41–2–20 (7)	Ellwood McCloskey	PTS	4 (?)	May 7, 1896	Globe Theater, Philadelphia, Pennsylvania, U.S.	
69	Win	40–2–20 (7)	Kentucky Rosebud	NWS	4	May 4, 1896	Globe Theater, Philadelphia, Pennsylvania, U.S.	
68	Win	40–2–20 (6)	Jerry Marshall	TKO	7 (?)	Mar 17, 1896	Prescott A.C., Boston, Massachusetts, U.S.	
67	Draw	39–2–20 (6)	Pedlar Palmer	PTS	6	Jan 30, 1896	Madison Square Garden, New York City, New York, U.S.	
66	Draw	39–2–19 (6)	Frank Erne	PTS	10	Dec 5, 1895	New Manhattan A.C., New York City, New York, U.S.	
65	Draw	39–2–18 (6)	Young Griffo	PTS	10	Oct 28, 1895	Manhattan A.C., New York City, New York, U.S.	
64	Win	39–2–17 (6)	Johnny Griffin	PTS	25	Aug 27, 1895	West Newton Street Armory, Boston, Massachusetts, U.S.	
63	NC	38–2–17 (6)	Mike Leonard	DC	1 (?)	Aug 19, 1895	Academy of Music, New York City, New York, U.S.	Inspector Cortright broke up the fight and arrested both men
62	Win	38–2–17 (5)	Tommy Connolly	DQ	4 (25)	Jul 31, 1895	Banta Hall, Boston, Massachusetts, U.S.	Connelly DQ'd after his cornerman Howie Hodgkins tried to help him up after a knockdown
61	Win	37–2–17 (5)	Charles Slusher	PTS	4 (?)	May 8, 1895	Louisville, Kentucky, U.S.	
60	Win	36–2–17 (5)	Sam Bolen	PTS	6	Mar 7, 1895	New York A.C., New York City, New York, U.S.	
59	Draw	35–2–17 (5)	Young Griffo	PTS	25	Jan 19, 1895	Seaside A.C., Coney Island, New York, U.S.	
58	Draw	35–2–16 (5)	Billy Whistler	PTS	4	Dec 26, 1894	Philadelphia, Pennsylvania, U.S.	Exact date unknown
57	Win	35–2–15 (5)	Joe Flynn	KO	4 (4)	Oct 25, 1894	Opera House, Wilmington, Delaware, U.S.	
56	Win	34–2–15 (5)	Jim Othello	KO	2 (?)	Sep 20, 1894	Pittsburgh, Pennsylvania, U.S.	
55	Draw	33–2–15 (5)	Young Griffo	PTS	20	Jun 29, 1894	Casino, Boston, Massachusetts, U.S.	
54	Win	33–2–14 (5)	Robert J Heeney	TKO	2 (?)	Jan 4, 1894	Opera House, Huntingdon, Pennsylvania, U.S.	
53	Win	32–2–14 (5)	Torpedo Billy Murphy	DQ	3 (?)	Dec 15, 1893	People's Theater, Paterson, New Jersey, U.S.	After attempting to break a clinch 3rd round, Murphy attacked the referee and began fighting him
52	Win	31–2–14 (5)	Solly Smith	TKO	7 (?)	Sep 25, 1893	Coney Island A.C., Brooklyn, New York City, New York, U.S.	Retained world featherweight title
51	Loss	30–2–14 (5)	Billy Plimmer	PTS	4	Aug 22, 1893	Madison Square Garden, New York City, New York, U.S.	
50	Win	30–1–14 (5)	Eddie Pierce	TKO	3 (?)	Aug 7, 1893	Coney Island A.C., Brooklyn, New York City, New York, U.S.	Retained world featherweight title
49	Draw	29–1–14 (5)	Jack Downey	PTS	4	Aug 1, 1893	Miners Theater, Brooklyn, New York City, New York, U.S.	Exact date unknown
48	Win	29–1–13 (5)	Kentucky Rosebud	NWS	4	Jul 1, 1893	Philadelphia, Pennsylvania, U.S.	
47	Win	29–1–13 (4)	Kentucky Rosebud	PTS	4	Jun 30, 1893	Philadelphia, Pennsylvania, U.S.	
46	Draw	28–1–13 (4)	Jerry Barnett	PTS	4 (?)	Jun 17, 1893	Academy of Music, New York City, New York, U.S.	
45	Win	28–1–12 (4)	Edward Rossman	TKO	1 (?)	May 3, 1893	Monumental Theater, Baltimore, Maryland, U.S.	
44	Win	27–1–12 (4)	Billy Nalley	TKO	1 (?)	May 2, 1893	Washington, D.C., U.S.	
43	Draw	26–1–12 (4)	George Siddons	PTS	12	Mar 20, 1893	Coney Island A.C., Brooklyn, New York City, New York, U.S.	
42	Win	26–1–11 (4)	Leo Dobbins	TKO	2 (?)	Feb 24, 1893	Horticultural Hall, Philadelphia, Pennsylvania, U.S.	
41	Win	25–1–11 (4)	Whitey Chadwick	TKO	2 (?)	Feb 23, 1893	Philadelphia, Pennsylvania, U.S.	
40	Win	24–1–11 (4)	Al Wright	TKO	1 (?)	Feb 22, 1893	Philadelphia, Pennsylvania, U.S.	
39	Win	23–1–11 (4)	Joe Reilly	PTS	? (?)	Feb 21, 1893	Philadelphia, Pennsylvania, U.S.	
38	Win	22–1–11 (4)	Buck Leary	KO	1 (4)	Feb 10, 1893	Miner's Bowery Theatre, New York City, New York, U.S.	
37	Win	21–1–11 (4)	Dick Mills	KO	1 (?)	Feb 7, 1893	New York City, New York, U.S.	
36	Win	20–1–11 (4)	Young Byrnes	PTS	4	Feb 6, 1893	New York City, New York, U.S.	
35	NC	19–1–11 (4)	Eddie Daly	ND	? (4)	Feb 1, 1893	Miners 8th St Theater, New York City, New York, U.S.	
34	NC	19–1–11 (3)	George Strong	ND	4	Jan 31, 1893	Miner's Bowery Theatre, New York City, New York, U.S.	
33	Win	19–1–11 (2)	Jim Keeley	KO	3 (?)	Dec 29, 1892	New York City, New York, U.S.	
32	NC	18–1–11 (2)	Kentucky Rosebud	ND	4	Nov 18, 1892	New York City, New York, U.S.	
31	Draw	18–1–11 (1)	Kentucky Rosebud	PTS	4	Nov 11, 1892	Lyceum Theater, Philadelphia, Pennsylvania, U.S.	
30	Win	18–1–10 (1)	William Bell	TKO	2 (4)	Nov 4, 1892	Howard Athenaeum, Boston, Massachusetts, U.S.	
29	Draw	17–1–10 (1)	Kentucky Rosebud	PTS	4	Oct 29, 1892	Ariel A.C., Philadelphia, Pennsylvania, U.S.	
28	Win	17–1–9 (1)	Jack Skelly	KO	8 (?)	Sep 6, 1892	Olympic Club, New Orleans, Louisiana, U.S.	Retained world bantamweight title
27	Win	16–1–9 (1)	Fred Johnson	KO	14 (?)	Jun 27, 1892	Coney Island Casino, Brooklyn, New York City, New York, U.S.	Won vacant world featherweight title
26	Win	15–1–9 (1)	Abe Willis	KO	5 (?)	Jul 28, 1891	California A.C., San Francisco, California, U.S.	Retained world bantamweight title
25	Win	14–1–9 (1)	Martin Flaherty	PTS	6	Apr 20, 1891	Battery D Armory, Chicago, Illinois, U.S.	
24	Win	13–1–9 (1)	Cal McCarthy	TKO	22 (?)	Mar 31, 1891	Troy Bicycle Club, Troy, New York, U.S.	Retained world featherweight title claim
23	Win	12–1–9 (1)	Johnny Murphy	KO	40 (?)	Oct 23, 1890	Gladstone Club, Providence, Rhode Island, U.S.	Won world featherweight title claim
22	Win	11–1–9 (1)	Nunc Wallace	RTD	19 (30)	Jun 27, 1890	New Pelican Club Gym, Soho, London, England	Won inaugural world bantamweight title
21	Draw	10–1–9 (1)	Cal McCarthy	PTS	70 (?)	Feb 7, 1890	Union AC, Boston, Massachusetts, U.S.	For American featherweight title; Dixon claimed the world featherweight title
20	Win	10–1–8 (1)	Eugene Hornbacher	KO	2 (?)	Dec 27, 1889	Hotel, New London, Connecticut, U.S.	Claimed American 115lbs title
19	Win	9–1–8 (1)	Mike Sullivan	PTS	6	Dec 11, 1889	New Bedford, Massachusetts, U.S.	Police intervened
18	Draw	8–1–8 (1)	Hank Brennan	PTS	26	Oct 14, 1889	Parnell A.C., Boston, Massachusetts, U.S.	
17	Loss	8–1–7 (1)	George Wright	DQ	2 (6)	Jun 3, 1889	Parnell A.C., Boston, Massachusetts, U.S.	Dixon struck Wright twice in the face after the bell and was DQ'd
16	Draw	8–0–7 (1)	Patsy Kelley	PTS	10	Mar 1, 1889	Putnam, Connecticut, U.S.	
15	Win	8–0–6 (1)	Patsy Kelley	PTS	10	Jan 29, 1889	Pelican Club, Boston, Massachusetts, U.S.	
14	Draw	7–0–6 (1)	Hank Brennan	PTS	15	Dec 28, 1888	Athenian Club, Boston, Massachusetts, U.S.	
13	Draw	7–0–5 (1)	Hank Brennan	PTS	9 (7)	Dec 4, 1888	Athenian Club, Boston, Massachusetts, U.S.	
12	Draw	7–0–4 (1)	Hank Brennan	PTS	14 (12)	Jun 21, 1888	Pelican Club, Boston, Massachusetts, U.S.	Bout scheduled for 12 rounds, but the referee called for two more
11	Win	7–0–3 (1)	Jimmy Brackett	KO	5 (6)	Jun 13, 1888	Way Street Gymnasium, Boston, Massachusetts, U.S.	
10	Win	6–0–3 (1)	Bob Green	NWS	6	Jun 7, 1888	Cribb Club, Boston, Massachusetts, U.S.	
9	Draw	6–0–3	Tommy Spider Kelly	PTS	9 (7)	May 10, 1888	Athenian Club, Boston, Massachusetts, U.S.	Scheduled seven round spar allowed to run nine rounds because of interest
8	Draw	6–0–2	Tommy Doherty	PTS	8	Apr 27, 1888	Way Street Gymnasium, Boston, Massachusetts, U.S.	
7	Draw	6–0–1	Patsy Kelley	PTS	15	Mar 21, 1888	Tremont A.C., Boston, Massachusetts, U.S.	
6	Win	6–0	Ned Morris	TKO	4 (7)	Mar 10, 1888	Athenian Club, Boston, Massachusetts, U.S.	
5	Win	5–0	Barney Finnegan	PTS	7	Feb 17, 1888	Athenian Club, Boston, Massachusetts, U.S.	
4	Win	4–0	Charlie Parton	TKO	6 (10)	Jan 20, 1888	Pelican Club, Boston, Massachusetts, U.S.	
3	Win	3–0	Johnny Lyman	TKO	5 (6)	Jan 1, 1888	Larley A.C., Boston, Massachusetts, U.S.	
2	Win	2–0	Elias Hamilton	PTS	8	Sep 21, 1887	Way Street Gymnasium, Boston, Massachusetts, U.S.	
1	Win	1–0	Young Johnson	KO	3 (?)	Nov 1, 1886	Halifax, Nova Scotia, Canada	

=== Unofficial record ===
176 fights	75 wins	32 losses
By knockout	36	6
By decision	36	25
By disqualification	3	1
Draws	61	
No contests	8	

Record with the inclusion of newspaper decisions to the win/loss/draw column.

No.	Result	Record	Opponent	Type	Round	Date	Location	Notes
176	Loss	76–32–61 (8)	Monk The Newsboy	PTS	15	Dec 10, 1906	Standard A.C., Lymansville, Rhode Island, U.S.	
175	Draw	76–31–61 (8)	Billy Ryan	PTS	12	May 21, 1906	Gloucester A.C., Gloucester, Massachusetts, U.S.	
174	Draw	76–31–60 (8)	Patsy Haley	NWS	3	Jan 16, 1906	Cayler A.C., Brooklyn, New York City, New York, U.S.	
173	Win	75–31–59 (8)	Harry Shea	KO	3 (?)	Jan 4, 1906	Roman A.C., New York City, New York, U.S.	
172	Win	74–31–59 (8)	Frank Howe	NWS	3	Dec 28, 1905	Long Acre A.C., New York City, New York, U.S.	
171	Loss	73–31–59 (8)	Harlem Tommy Murphy	KO	2 (6)	Sep 20, 1905	National A.C., Philadelphia, Pennsylvania, U.S.	
170	Draw	73–30–59 (8)	Joe Goodwin	PTS	10	Jun 26, 1905	Labour Hall, Manchester, Lancashire, England	
169	Win	73–30–58 (8)	Alf Wood	PTS	8	Jun 8, 1905	Cosmopolitan Sporting Club, Marylebone, London, England	
168	Draw	72–30–58 (8)	Dick Nelson	PTS	10	May 28, 1905	Copenhagen, Denmark	
167	Draw	72–30–57 (8)	Bob White	PTS	6	Apr 17, 1905	Corn Exchange, Bedford, Bedfordshire, England	
166	Draw	72–30–56 (8)	Darkey Haley	PTS	6	Apr 15, 1905	Wonderland, Whitechapel Road, Mile End, London, England	
165	Draw	72–30–55 (8)	Jack Foy	PTS	15	Apr 6, 1905	Cosmopolitan Sporting Club, Marylebone, London, England	
164	NC	72–30–54 (8)	Jim Keith	ND	3	Apr 1, 1905	Waverley Market, Edinburgh, Scotland	No decision trial bout
163	Draw	72–30–54 (7)	Cockney Cohen	PTS	20	Mar 6, 1905	Norfolk Drill Hall, Sheffield, Yorkshire, England	Billed English 8st 8lbs title
162	Win	72–30–53 (7)	Stoker Stoodley	TKO	5 (20)	Feb 25, 1905	Volunteer Engineers Drill Hall, Portsmouth, Hampshire, England	
161	Draw	71–30–53 (7)	Darkey Haley	PTS	6	Feb 18, 1905	Wonderland, Whitechapel Road, Mile End, London, England	
160	Loss	71–30–52 (7)	Bob White	PTS	6	Jan 30, 1905	Drill Hall, Guildford, Surrey, England	
159	Draw	71–29–52 (7)	Johnny Hughes	PTS	8	Jan 6, 1905	Corn Exchange, Ashford, Kent, England	
158	Draw	71–29–51 (7)	Bob White	PTS	6	Dec 23, 1904	Philharmonic Hall, Southampton, Hampshire, England	
157	Draw	71–29–50 (7)	Boss Edwards	PTS	15	Nov 24, 1904	Cosmopolitan Sporting Club, Marylebone, London, England	
156	Loss	71–29–49 (7)	Owen Moran	PTS	6	Oct 17, 1904	National Sporting Club, Covent Garden, London, England	
155	Loss	71–28–49 (7)	Tommy Burns	PTS	20	Apr 21, 1904	Liverpool Gymnastic Club, Liverpool, Merseyside, England	
154	Draw	71–27–49 (7)	George Moore	PTS	6	Apr 9, 1904	Wonderland, Whitechapel Road, Mile End, London, England	
153	NC	71–27–48 (7)	Spike Robson	NC	11 (20)	Mar 19, 1904	Ginnetts Circus, Newcastle, Tyne and Wear, England	The referee declared a no contest as Robson was suffering from a liver complaint
152	Loss	71–27–48 (6)	Cockney Cohen	PTS	15	Mar 7, 1904	Leeds and County Athletic Club, Leeds, Yorkshire, England	
151	Draw	71–26–48 (6)	Harry Mansfield	PTS	20	Feb 22, 1904	Winter Gardens, Plymouth, Devon, England	
150	Loss	71–26–47 (6)	Jim Driscoll	PTS	6	Feb 10, 1904	Bristol, Avon, England	
149	Draw	71–25–47 (6)	Johnny Summers	PTS	6	Feb 6, 1904	Wonderland, Whitechapel Road, Mile End, London, England	
148	Win	71–25–46 (6)	Cockney Cohen	KO	8 (20)	Jan 16, 1904	Ginnetts Circus, Newcastle, Tyne and Wear, England	Retained world 120lbs title claim
147	Draw	70–25–46 (6)	Dai Morgan	PTS	15	Dec 19, 1903	Ivor Athletic Club, Swansea, Wales	
146	Win	70–25–45 (6)	Cockney Cohen	PTS	20	Dec 7, 1903	Ginnetts Circus, Newcastle, Tyne and Wear, England	Retained world 120lbs title claim
145	Win	69–25–45 (6)	Pedlar Palmer	PTS	20	Nov 9, 1903	Ginnetts Circus, Newcastle, Tyne and Wear, England	Claimed vacant world 120lbs title
144	Draw	68–25–45 (6)	Charlie Lampey	PTS	6	Oct 29, 1903	Public Hall, Barking Road, Canning Town, London, England	
143	Loss	68–25–44 (6)	Digger Stanley	PTS	6	Oct 12, 1903	National Sporting Club, Covent Garden, London, England	
142	Win	68–24–44 (6)	Jim Williams	TKO	4 (6)	Oct 10, 1903	Wonderland, Whitechapel Road, Mile End, London, England	
141	Draw	67–24–44 (6)	Charlie Lampey	PTS	6	Sep 29, 1903	London, England	
140	NC	67–24–43 (6)	Dave Wallace	ND	6	Sep 28, 1903	Pretoria Gymnasium, Birmingham, West Midlands, England	No decision trial bout
139	Draw	67–24–43 (5)	Billy Barrett	PTS	20	Sep 24, 1903	Liverpool Gymnastic Club, Liverpool, England	
138	Draw	67–24–42 (5)	Charlie Lampey	PTS	6	Sep 14, 1903	Wonderland, Whitechapel Road, Mile End, London, England	
137	Win	67–24–41 (5)	Harry Ware	PTS	6	Aug 29, 1903	Wonderland, Whitechapel Road, Mile End, London, England	
136	Win	66–24–41 (5)	Digger Stanley	PTS	6	Aug 1, 1903	Wonderland, Whitechapel Road, Mile End, London, England	
135	Loss	65–24–41 (5)	Pedlar Palmer	PTS	8	Jun 27, 1903	Wonderland, Whitechapel Road, Mile End, London, England	
134	Draw	65–23–41 (5)	'Young' Harry Paul	PTS	6	Jun 15, 1903	Wonderland, Whitechapel Road, Mile End, London, England	
133	Loss	65–23–40 (5)	Jim Driscoll	KO	5 (?)	Jun 1, 1903	Wales	Fight date, time and place not exact -- need source for this bout
132	Draw	65–22–40 (5)	George Phalin	PTS	15	May 25, 1903	Jem Mace's Gymnasium, Birmingham, West Midlands, England	
131	Loss	65–22–39 (5)	Spike Robson	PTS	20	May 16, 1903	Ginnetts Circus, Newcastle, Tyne and Wear, England	
130	Loss	65–21–39 (5)	Ben Jordan	PTS	6	May 2, 1903	Wonderland, Whitechapel Road, Mile End, London, England	
129	Draw	65–20–39 (5)	George Phalin	PTS	15	Apr 16, 1903	Liverpool, Merseyside, England	
128	Loss	65–20–38 (5)	Spike Robson	PTS	15	Apr 11, 1903	Ginnetts Circus, Newcastle, Tyne and Wear, England	
127	Win	65–19–38 (5)	Jack Pearson	KO	8 (?)	Apr 6, 1903	Liverpool, Merseyside, England	
126	Loss	64–19–38 (5)	Fred Delaney	PTS	6	Feb 28, 1903	Beresford Street Drill Hall, Woolwich, London, England	
125	Draw	64–18–38 (5)	Dave Wallace	PTS	6	Feb 20, 1903	Birmingham, West Midlands, England	Exact date unknown
124	Draw	64–18–37 (5)	Harry Ware	PTS	20	Feb 9, 1903	Corn Exchange, Northampton, Northamptonshire, England	Billed world 116lbs title claim
123	Loss	64–18–36 (5)	Jim Driscoll	PTS	8	Jan 24, 1903	Theatre Royal, Cadoxton, Wales	
122	NC	64–17–36 (5)	Jim Courtney	ND	6	Jan 19, 1903	Theater Royale, Cadoxton-Barry, Wales	
121	Win	64–17–36 (4)	Harry Smith	KO	3 (6)	Nov 15, 1902	Canterbury Theatre of Varieties, Lambeth, London, England	
120	Draw	63–17–36 (4)	Will Curley	PTS	15	Sep 29, 1902	Standard Theatre, Gateshead, Tyne and Wear, England	
119	Loss	63–17–35 (4)	Pedlar Palmer	PTS	15	Sep 8, 1902	New National Athletic Club, Marylebone, London, England	
118	Draw	63–16–35 (4)	Tim Callahan	NWS	6	Jun 30, 1902	Golden Gate A.C., Philadelphia, Pennsylvania, U.S.	
117	Loss	63–16–34 (4)	Biz Mackey	TKO	5 (10)	Jun 10, 1902	Business Men's A.C., Findlay, Ohio, U.S.	
116	Draw	63–15–34 (4)	Eddie Lenny	NWS	6	Jun 6, 1902	Armory Hall, Chester, Pennsylvania, U.S.	
115	Loss	63–15–33 (4)	Danny Dougherty	NWS	7	May 27, 1902	Globe A.C., Philadelphia, Pennsylvania, U.S.	
114	Draw	63–14–33 (4)	Billy Ryan	PTS	15	May 16, 1902	Dey's Rink, Ottawa, Ontario, Canada	
113	Win	63–14–32 (4)	Chick Tucker	PTS	20	Feb 13, 1902	National A.C., New Britain, Connecticut, U.S.	
112	Loss	62–14–32 (4)	Eddie Lenny	TKO	9 (20)	Jan 24, 1902	Germania Maennerchor Hall, Baltimore, Maryland, U.S.	
111	Draw	62–13–32 (4)	Joe Tipman	PTS	20	Jan 17, 1902	Germania Maennerchor Hall, Baltimore, Maryland, U.S.	
110	Loss	62–13–31 (4)	Austin Rice	PTS	20	Dec 19, 1901	Opera House, New London, Connecticut, U.S.	
109	Loss	62–12–31 (4)	Abe Attell	PTS	15	Oct 28, 1901	West End A.C., Saint Louis, Missouri, U.S.	
108	Loss	62–11–31 (4)	Benny Yanger	PTS	15	Sep 26, 1901	Saint Louis, Missouri, U.S.	
107	Draw	62–10–31 (4)	Abe Attell	PTS	20	Sep 12, 1901	Grand Opera House, Cripple Creek, Colorado, U.S.	
106	Draw	62–10–30 (4)	Abe Attell	PTS	10	Aug 23, 1901	Coliseum Hall, Denver, Colorado, U.S.	
105	Loss	62–10–29 (4)	Young Corbett II	PTS	10	Aug 16, 1901	Coliseum Hall, Denver, Colorado, U.S.	For Western featherweight championship
104	Draw	62–9–29 (4)	Harry Lyons	PTS	20	Feb 8, 1901	Germania Maennerchor Hall, Baltimore, Maryland, U.S.	
103	Loss	62–9–28 (4)	Tommy Sullivan	TKO	7 (25)	Jul 31, 1901	Seaside A.C., Brooklyn, New York City, New York, U.S.	
102	Loss	62–8–28 (4)	Terry McGovern	PTS	6	Jun 23, 1900	Tattersall's, Chicago, Illinois, U.S.	
101	Draw	62–7–28 (4)	Benny Yanger	PTS	6	Jun 12, 1900	Tattersall's, Chicago, Illinois, U.S.	
100	Loss	62–7–27 (4)	Tim Callahan	NWS	6	Jun 4, 1900	Penn Art Club, Philadelphia, Pennsylvania, U.S.	
99	Loss	62–6–27 (4)	Terry McGovern	TKO	8 (25)	Jan 9, 1900	Broadway A.C., New York City, New York, U.S.	Lost world featherweight title
98	Win	62–5–27 (4)	Eddie Lenny	PTS	25	Nov 21, 1899	Broadway A.C., Brooklyn, New York City, New York, U.S.	Retained world featherweight title
97	Win	61–5–27 (4)	Will Curley	PTS	25	Nov 2, 1899	Broadway A.C., Brooklyn, New York City, New York, U.S.	Retained world featherweight title
96	Win	60–5–27 (4)	Tim Callahan	NWS	6	Oct 13, 1899	Industrial Hall, Philadelphia, Pennsylvania, U.S.	
95	Draw	59–5–27 (4)	Eddie Santry	PTS	20	Aug 11, 1899	Broadway A.C., New York City, New York, U.S.	Retained world featherweight title
94	Win	59–5–26 (4)	Eddie Santry	PTS	6	Jul 14, 1899	Star Theatre, Chicago, Illinois, U.S.	
93	Win	58–5–26 (4)	Tommy White	PTS	20	Jul 11, 1899	Olympic A.C., Denver, Colorado, U.S.	Retained world featherweight title
92	Win	57–5–26 (4)	Sam Bolen	KO	3 (25)	Jul 3, 1899	Music Hall, Louisville, Kentucky, U.S.	Retained world featherweight title
91	Win	56–5–26 (4)	Joe Bernstein	PTS	25	Jun 2, 1899	Broadway A.C., Brooklyn, New York City, New York, U.S.	Retained world featherweight title
90	Win	55–5–26 (4)	Kid Broad	PTS	20	May 15, 1899	Olympic A.C., Buffalo, New York City, New York, U.S.	Retained world featherweight title
89	Win	54–5–26 (4)	Young Pluto	KO	10 (25)	Jan 17, 1899	Lenox A.C., New York City, New York, U.S.	Retained world featherweight title
88	Win	53–5–26 (4)	Oscar Gardner	PTS	25	Nov 29, 1898	Lenox A.C., New York City, New York, U.S.	Retained world featherweight title
87	Win	52–5–26 (4)	Dave Sullivan	DQ	10 (25)	Nov 11, 1898	Lenox A.C., New York City, New York, U.S.	Won world featherweight title
86	Win	51–5–26 (4)	Joe Bernstein	NWS	6	Sep 5, 1898	Arena A.C., Philadelphia, Pennsylvania, U.S.	
85	Win	50–5–26 (4)	Jimmy Dunn	NWS	6	Aug 29, 1898	Casino, Fall River, Massachusetts, U.S.	
84	Loss	49–5–26 (4)	Ben Jordan	PTS	25	Jul 1, 1898	Lenox A.C., New York, New York, U.S.	
83	Win	49–4–26 (4)	Eddie Santry	PTS	20	Jun 6, 1898	Lenox A.C., New York, New York, U.S.	
82	Draw	48–4–26 (4)	Tommy White	PTS	20	Mar 31, 1898	Empire A.C., Syracuse, New York, U.S.	
81	Loss	48–4–25 (4)	Solly Smith	PTS	20	Oct 4, 1897	Mechanic's Pavilion, San Francisco, California, U.S.	Lost world featherweight title
80	Draw	48–3–25 (4)	Dal Hawkins	PTS	20	Jul 23, 1897	Mechanic's Pavilion, San Francisco, California, U.S.	
79	Draw	48–3–24 (4)	Kentucky Rosebud	NWS	6	Jun 21, 1897	Arena, Philadelphia, Pennsylvania, U.S.	
78	Win	48–3–23 (4)	Johnny Griffin	PTS	20	Apr 26, 1897	Broadway A.C., Brooklyn, New York City, New York, U.S.	
77	Win	47–3–23 (4)	Frank Erne	PTS	25	Mar 24, 1897	Broadway A.C., Brooklyn, New York City, New York, U.S.	Won world featherweight title
76	Draw	46–3–23 (4)	Jack Downey	PTS	20	Feb 15, 1897	Broadway A.C., Brooklyn, New York City, New York, U.S.	
75	Win	46–3–22 (4)	Torpedo Billy Murphy	KO	6 (20)	Jan 22, 1897	Broadway A.C., Brooklyn, New York City, New York, U.S.	Billed World 120lbs featherweight title claim
74	Loss	45–3–22 (4)	Frank Erne	PTS	20	Nov 27, 1896	Broadway A.C., New York City, New York, U.S.	Lost world featherweight title; Dixon continued to claim the title despite this title loss
73	Draw	45–2–22 (4)	Tommy White	PTS	20	Sep 25, 1896	Broadway A.C., New York City, New York, U.S.	Retained world featherweight title
72	Draw	45–2–21 (4)	Martin Flaherty	PTS	20	Jun 16, 1896	West Newton Street Armory, Boston, Massachusetts, U.S.	
71	Win	45–2–20 (4)	Charles Slusher	PTS	4 (?)	May 9, 1896	Louisville, Kentucky, U.S.	
70	Win	44–2–20 (4)	Ellwood McCloskey	PTS	4 (?)	May 7, 1896	Globe Theater, Philadelphia, Pennsylvania, U.S.	
69	Win	43–2–20 (4)	Kentucky Rosebud	NWS	4	May 4, 1896	Globe Theater, Philadelphia, Pennsylvania, U.S.	
68	Win	42–2–20 (4)	Jerry Marshall	TKO	7 (?)	Mar 17, 1896	Prescott A.C., Boston, Massachusetts, U.S.	
67	Draw	41–2–20 (4)	Pedlar Palmer	PTS	6	Jan 30, 1896	Madison Square Garden, New York City, New York, U.S.	
66	Draw	41–2–19 (4)	Frank Erne	PTS	10	Dec 5, 1895	New Manhattan A.C., New York City, New York, U.S.	
65	Draw	41–2–18 (4)	Young Griffo	PTS	10	Oct 28, 1895	Manhattan A.C., New York City, New York, U.S.	
64	Win	41–2–17 (4)	Johnny Griffin	PTS	25	Aug 27, 1895	West Newton Street Armory, Boston, Massachusetts, U.S.	
63	NC	40–2–17 (4)	Mike Leonard	DC	1 (?)	Aug 19, 1895	Academy of Music, New York City, New York, U.S.	Inspector Cortright broke up the fight and arrested both men
62	Win	40–2–17 (3)	Tommy Connolly	DQ	4 (25)	Jul 31, 1895	Banta Hall, Boston, Massachusetts, U.S.	Connelly DQ'd after his cornerman Howie Hodgkins tried to help him up after a knockdown
61	Win	39–2–17 (3)	Charles Slusher	PTS	4 (?)	May 8, 1895	Louisville, Kentucky, U.S.	
60	Win	38–2–17 (3)	Sam Bolen	PTS	6	Mar 7, 1895	New York A.C., New York City, New York, U.S.	
59	Draw	37–2–17 (3)	Young Griffo	PTS	25	Jan 19, 1895	Seaside A.C., Coney Island, New York, U.S.	
58	Draw	37–2–16 (3)	Billy Whistler	PTS	4	Dec 26, 1894	Philadelphia, Pennsylvania, U.S.	Exact date unknown
57	Win	37–2–15 (3)	Joe Flynn	KO	4 (4)	Oct 25, 1894	Opera House, Wilmington, Delaware, U.S.	
56	Win	36–2–15 (3)	Jim Othello	KO	2 (?)	Sep 20, 1894	Pittsburgh, Pennsylvania, U.S.	
55	Draw	35–2–15 (3)	Young Griffo	PTS	20	Jun 29, 1894	Casino, Boston, Massachusetts, U.S.	
54	Win	35–2–14 (3)	Robert J Heeney	TKO	2 (?)	Jan 4, 1894	Opera House, Huntingdon, Pennsylvania, U.S.	
53	Win	34–2–14 (3)	Torpedo Billy Murphy	DQ	3 (?)	Dec 15, 1893	People's Theater, Paterson, New Jersey, U.S.	After attempting to break a clinch 3rd round, Murphy attacked the referee and began fighting him
52	Win	33–2–14 (3)	Solly Smith	TKO	7 (?)	Sep 25, 1893	Coney Island A.C., Brooklyn, New York City, New York, U.S.	Retained world featherweight title
51	Loss	32–2–14 (3)	Billy Plimmer	PTS	4	Aug 22, 1893	Madison Square Garden, New York City, New York, U.S.	
50	Win	32–1–14 (3)	Eddie Pierce	TKO	3 (?)	Aug 7, 1893	Coney Island A.C., Brooklyn, New York City, New York, U.S.	Retained world featherweight title
49	Draw	31–1–14 (3)	Jack Downey	PTS	4	Aug 1, 1893	Miners Theater, Brooklyn, New York City, New York, U.S.	Exact date unknown
48	Win	31–1–13 (3)	Kentucky Rosebud	NWS	4	Jul 1, 1893	Philadelphia, Pennsylvania, U.S.	
47	Win	30–1–13 (3)	Kentucky Rosebud	PTS	4	Jun 30, 1893	Philadelphia, Pennsylvania, U.S.	
46	Draw	29–1–13 (3)	Jerry Barnett	PTS	4 (?)	Jun 17, 1893	Academy of Music, New York City, New York, U.S.	
45	Win	29–1–12 (3)	Edward Rossman	TKO	1 (?)	May 3, 1893	Monumental Theater, Baltimore, Maryland, U.S.	
44	Win	28–1–12 (3)	Billy Nalley	TKO	1 (?)	May 2, 1893	Washington, D.C., U.S.	
43	Draw	27–1–12 (3)	George Siddons	PTS	12	Mar 20, 1893	Coney Island A.C., Brooklyn, New York City, New York, U.S.	
42	Win	27–1–11 (3)	Leo Dobbins	TKO	2 (?)	Feb 24, 1893	Horticultural Hall, Philadelphia, Pennsylvania, U.S.	
41	Win	26–1–11 (3)	Whitey Chadwick	TKO	2 (?)	Feb 23, 1893	Philadelphia, Pennsylvania, U.S.	
40	Win	25–1–11 (3)	Al Wright	TKO	1 (?)	Feb 22, 1893	Philadelphia, Pennsylvania, U.S.	
39	Win	24–1–11 (3)	Joe Reilly	PTS	? (?)	Feb 21, 1893	Philadelphia, Pennsylvania, U.S.	
38	Win	23–1–11 (3)	Buck Leary	KO	1 (4)	Feb 10, 1893	Miner's Bowery Theatre, New York City, New York, U.S.	
37	Win	22–1–11 (3)	Dick Mills	KO	1 (?)	Feb 7, 1893	New York City, New York, U.S.	
36	Win	21–1–11 (3)	Young Byrnes	PTS	4	Feb 6, 1893	New York City, New York, U.S.	
35	NC	20–1–11 (3)	Eddie Daly	ND	? (4)	Feb 1, 1893	Miners 8th St Theater, New York City, New York, U.S.	
34	NC	20–1–11 (2)	George Strong	ND	4	Jan 31, 1893	Miner's Bowery Theatre, New York City, New York, U.S.	
33	Win	20–1–11 (1)	Jim Keeley	KO	3 (?)	Dec 29, 1892	New York City, New York, U.S.	
32	NC	19–1–11 (1)	Kentucky Rosebud	ND	4	Nov 18, 1892	New York City, New York, U.S.	
31	Draw	19–1–11	Kentucky Rosebud	PTS	4	Nov 11, 1892	Lyceum Theater, Philadelphia, Pennsylvania, U.S.	
30	Win	19–1–10	William Bell	TKO	2 (4)	Nov 4, 1892	Howard Athenaeum, Boston, Massachusetts, U.S.	
29	Draw	18–1–10	Kentucky Rosebud	PTS	4	Oct 29, 1892	Ariel A.C., Philadelphia, Pennsylvania, U.S.	
28	Win	18–1–9	Jack Skelly	KO	8 (?)	Sep 6, 1892	Olympic Club, New Orleans, Louisiana, U.S.	Retained world bantamweight title
27	Win	17–1–9	Fred Johnson	KO	14 (?)	Jun 27, 1892	Coney Island Casino, Brooklyn, New York City, New York, U.S.	Won vacant world featherweight title
26	Win	16–1–9	Abe Willis	KO	5 (?)	Jul 28, 1891	California A.C., San Francisco, California, U.S.	Retained world bantamweight title
25	Win	15–1–9	Martin Flaherty	PTS	6	Apr 20, 1891	Battery D Armory, Chicago, Illinois, U.S.	
24	Win	14–1–9	Cal McCarthy	TKO	22 (?)	Mar 31, 1891	Troy Bicycle Club, Troy, New York, U.S.	Retained world featherweight title claim
23	Win	13–1–9	Johnny Murphy	KO	40 (?)	Oct 23, 1890	Gladstone Club, Providence, Rhode Island, U.S.	Won world featherweight title claim
22	Win	12–1–9	Nunc Wallace	RTD	19 (30)	Jun 27, 1890	New Pelican Club Gym, Soho, London, England	Won inaugural world bantamweight title
21	Draw	11–1–9	Cal McCarthy	PTS	70 (?)	Feb 7, 1890	Union AC, Boston, Massachusetts, U.S.	For American featherweight title; Dixon claimed the world featherweight title
20	Win	11–1–8	Eugene Hornbacher	KO	2 (?)	Dec 27, 1889	Hotel, New London, Connecticut, U.S.	Claimed American 115lbs title
19	Win	10–1–8	Mike Sullivan	PTS	6	Dec 11, 1889	New Bedford, Massachusetts, U.S.	Police intervened
18	Draw	9–1–8	Hank Brennan	PTS	26	Oct 14, 1889	Parnell A.C., Boston, Massachusetts, U.S.	
17	Loss	9–1–7	George Wright	DQ	2 (6)	Jun 3, 1889	Parnell A.C., Boston, Massachusetts, U.S.	Dixon struck Wright twice in the face after the bell and was DQ'd
16	Draw	9–0–7	Patsy Kelley	PTS	10	Mar 1, 1889	Putnam, Connecticut, U.S.	
15	Win	9–0–6	Patsy Kelley	PTS	10	Jan 29, 1889	Pelican Club, Boston, Massachusetts, U.S.	
14	Draw	8–0–6	Hank Brennan	PTS	15	Dec 28, 1888	Athenian Club, Boston, Massachusetts, U.S.	
13	Draw	8–0–5	Hank Brennan	PTS	9 (7)	Dec 4, 1888	Athenian Club, Boston, Massachusetts, U.S.	
12	Draw	8–0–4	Hank Brennan	PTS	14 (12)	Jun 21, 1888	Pelican Club, Boston, Massachusetts, U.S.	Bout scheduled for 12 rounds, but the referee called for two more
11	Win	8–0–3	Jimmy Brackett	KO	5 (6)	Jun 13, 1888	Way Street Gymnasium, Boston, Massachusetts, U.S.	
10	Win	7–0–3	Bob Green	NWS	6	Jun 7, 1888	Cribb Club, Boston, Massachusetts, U.S.	
9	Draw	6–0–3	Tommy Spider Kelly	PTS	9 (7)	May 10, 1888	Athenian Club, Boston, Massachusetts, U.S.	Scheduled seven round spar allowed to run nine rounds because of interest
8	Draw	6–0–2	Tommy Doherty	PTS	8	Apr 27, 1888	Way Street Gymnasium, Boston, Massachusetts, U.S.	
7	Draw	6–0–1	Patsy Kelley	PTS	15	Mar 21, 1888	Tremont A.C., Boston, Massachusetts, U.S.	
6	Win	6–0	Ned Morris	TKO	4 (7)	Mar 10, 1888	Athenian Club, Boston, Massachusetts, U.S.	
5	Win	5–0	Barney Finnegan	PTS	7	Feb 17, 1888	Athenian Club, Boston, Massachusetts, U.S.	
4	Win	4–0	Charlie Parton	TKO	6 (10)	Jan 20, 1888	Pelican Club, Boston, Massachusetts, U.S.	
3	Win	3–0	Johnny Lyman	TKO	5 (6)	Jan 1, 1888	Larley A.C., Boston, Massachusetts, U.S.	
2	Win	2–0	Elias Hamilton	PTS	8	Sep 21, 1887	Way Street Gymnasium, Boston, Massachusetts, U.S.	
1	Win	1–0	Young Johnson	KO	3 (?)	Nov 1, 1886	Halifax, Nova Scotia, Canada	

== In popular culture ==
Dixon appears in "Glory Days" (October 20, 2014), episode 3 of season 8 of the Canadian television period drama Murdoch Mysteries. Dixon is played by Canadian actor Milton Barnes.

Achievements
Inaugural Champion	World Bantamweight Champion; June 27, 1890 – 1891; Abandoned	Vacant Title next held by Jimmy Barry
Vacant Title last held by Young Griffo	World Featherweight Champion; June 27, 1892 – October 4, 1897	Succeeded by Solly Smith
Preceded by Dave Sullivan	World Featherweight Champion; November 11, 1898 – January 9, 1900	Succeeded by Terry McGovern
