= National Register of Historic Places listings in Glascock County, Georgia =

This is a list of properties and districts in Glascock County, Georgia that are listed on the National Register of Historic Places (NRHP).

This National Park Service list is complete through NPS recent listings posted March 21, 2025.

== Current listings ==
	Name on the Register	Image	Date listed	Location	City or town	Description
1	Glascock County Courthouse	Glascock County Courthouse	September 18, 1980 (#80001082)	Main St. 33°13′59″N 82°35′42″W	Gibson	
