= Eddie Santry =

American boxer (1876–1919)

Personal information
- Born: Edward M. Santry; December 11, 1876 Aurora, Illinois, US
- Died: January 28, 1919 (aged 42) Chicago, Illinois, US
- Height: 5 ft 5.5 in (1.66 m)
- Weight: Featherweight

Boxing career
- Stance: orthodox

Boxing record
- Total fights: 83
- Wins: 48
- Win by KO: 32
- Losses: 17
- Draws: 16
- No contests: 2

Edward M. Santry (December 11, 1876 – January 28, 1919) was an American featherweight boxer who took the World Featherweight Championship on October 10, 1899, against English Featherweight Champion Ben Jordan in a tenth-round knockout at the Lenox Athletic Club in New York, New York.

Santry lost his title on February 1, 1900, to Terry McGovern in a fifth-round technical knockout at Tattersall's in Chicago before an impressive crowd of 15,000. He was managed by Ted Murphy for most of his career.

== Early life early career ==
Santry was born on December 11, 1876, in Aurora, Illinois. According to boxing lore, and his own accounts, he took up boxing when he was badly underweight and suffering from consumption on the advice of physicians who recommended exercise. He was a boxing pupil of Harry Gilmore of Chicago, who also taught Chicago boxers Tommy White and 1901 World Bantamweight Champion Harry Forbes.

Santry began his professional boxing career around 1895 in the Chicago area where he won six of his first seven fights by knockout. From 1895 to 1896, he knocked out Young Casey in 3 rounds, Jimmy "Spider" Kelly in 1, Kid Reynolds in 2, the well known Eddie Curry in 4, Jim Gilchrist in 6, and Jack Smith in 1. In his first sixteen fights between March 22, 1895, and June 1, 1897, he lost only once to the well known fellow Chicago featherweight Tommy White by knockout at the Midway Theater in Lamont, Illinois in August 1896. White would become one of his better known opponents.

Santry fought three boxers who would hold world championships and an impressive contender in 1898; Solly Smith to a six-round draw in Chicago, George Dixon in a twenty-round loss in New York's Lenox Club, Jewish New York featherweight contender Joe Bernstein in a twenty-round loss on points in New York's Lenox Club and Australian featherweight champion Torpedo Billy Murphy in an impressive fourth-round knockout win in St. Louis, Missouri. Dixon was the favorite in the early betting for his June 6 bout.

== Taking the World Featherweight Championship ==
Prior to his taking the World Featherweight Title, he fought two more important bouts with the great Black Canadian featherweight George Dixon, losing the first on July 14, 1899, at the Star Theatre in Chicago in a sixth round points decision. On August 11, 1899, he fought a twenty-round draw with Dixon at the Broadway Athletic Club in New York City.

On October 10, 1899, Santry overtook the world title defeating Ben Jordan at the Lenox Club in New York in a sixteenth of twenty-round knockout. He knocked out Jordan with a "clean right hand swing to the jaw." Santry achieved the knockout in a little less than two minutes into the sixteenth round. Until the knockout, Jordan had been outpointing Santry, though he suffered a knockdown in the first round. Apparently, Jordan had tired somewhat by the sixteenth round compared to his opponent. One source wrote that "until the knockout Jordan was far ahead on points but Santry's blows were truer to the mark and won him the battle." Santry had a slight advantage in height, though Jordan was a 2 to 1 favorite in the betting. After the bout, in an interview, Santry complained of losing a few teeth, and having badly banged up his hands from his bout with the English champion. He claimed that Jordan so frequently changed his style of boxing, it was difficult to predict his movements.

== Losing the World Featherweight Championship to Terry McGovern ==
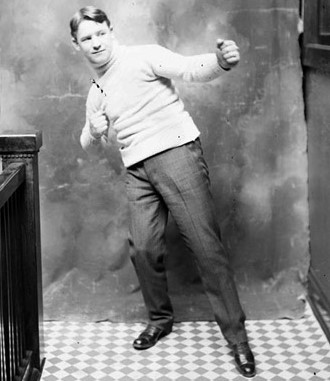
Terry McGovern

Santry claimed the World Featherweight Championship after his knockout of Ben Jordan, but his title was not universally recognized at the time. It is today by the World Boxing Organization. He lost his title on February 1, 1900, to the great Terry McGovern in a fifth-round technical knockout at Tattersall's in Chicago. An exceptionally large crowd of 15,000 watched the bout.

One source noted "the knockout came in the fifth round after a fierce mixup in which Santry did some clever work but Terry was too strong for the Chicago lad and straightening Santry up with a short arm jolt to the stomach, landed a left and right to the jaw in quick succession...Santry fell to the floor on his face. Santry rose at the count of ten but referee Siler called the bout to prevent him from any further punishment." Santry was down for the count in the second but arose and may have had an advantage in the long range fighting as he had a two-inch advantage in height. Sam Pooler acted as Santry's manager for the bouts. Once McGovern defeated Santry, he reunited the Featherweight Title, and gained recognition in both the British empire, and the United States as a World Champion.

=== Two bouts with Oscar Gardner after loss of the title ===
He followed his loss of the title with two important battles against World Featherweight contender Oscar Gardner, losing in a fifth-round knockout at the Music Hall in Louisville, Kentucky on May 3, 1900, and then winning in a twenty-round newspaper decision at Convention Hall in Kansas City, Missouri, on July 6.

The battle in Louisville was ended two minutes and thirty seconds into the fifth round, when Gardner put Santry away with a "short arm straight left to the pit of the stomach", that landed Santry on the canvas. Santry was thought to have had a lead in points when the blow was delivered. One source described the blow to Santry as landing on his Solar Plexus, and occurring shortly after Gardner pushed Santry away from a tight clinch. Santry dropped to the canvas in pain. He had a slight height advantage, and may have been ahead on points landing often through the first four rounds. However, he lacked the energy of Gardner by the fifth round when the knockout occurred.

Santry's July 6 win over Oscar Gardner in Kansas City was described as "fast and furious", though Gardner was not in the best condition appearing with yellow skin and suffering from a common boxer's ailment, bruised hands. Santry had an advantage in height and though he tired in round twelve, he had more energy by the twentieth, when the bout ended with a referee decision in his favor. The July battle which drew a crowd of 5000 in Kansas City took place shortly after all the delegates had left from the Democratic National Convention which had been held there that week.

== Injury to knee and subsequent bouts including Young Corbett II and Battling Nelson ==
Around November 8, 1900, Santry's knee was badly injured while sparring with Californian and Middleweight Champion Tommy Ryan who had several bouts in Chicago that month. While attempting a side step to avoid a left from Ryan, his ankle turned and the full weight of his body was thrown on his knee joint in a twisting fashion. At the time, the injury was considered to be serious and he briefly took up working in a Saloon. He resumed his training by early January but lost to Jack McClelland, in a four-round knockout on January 29, 1901. He would face McClelland again a year later on February 19, 1902, in a six-round draw in Chicago.

Santry lost again to the great Young Corbett II in a second-round knockout in Denver, Colorado, on April 12, 1901. He would act as a sparring partner to Corbett by the Spring of 1902. Strongly affected by his losses to McClelland and particularly Young Corbett, he took a seven-month rest from boxing before his next bout. His record after the injury showed fewer wins by knockout, and his opponents may have been a shade less skilled.

On November 29, 1901, Santry fought future champion Battling Nelson at the Pyramid Athletic Club in Chicago, winning in a six-round points decision. At various times in his career, he would spar, train, and act as a cornerman for Nelson, a fellow Chicagoan and 1908 lightweight champion.

On December 27, 1901, Santry won on a second round disqualification against Ole Olsen in Omaha, Nebraska. Santry slipped to the floor from a blow, and Olsen struck him before he had time to rise to his knees. Olsen later apologized for the infraction.

== Later career ==
Santry fought Tommy Sullivan three times in April and May 1902, with a win by disqualification, and a no contest in Chicago, followed by a loss in a third knockout in St. Louis, Missouri. He had two wins against Maurice Sayers at the end of 1903 and early 1904. In the Tommy Sullivan bout on April 18, 1902, the referee determined that Santry had been kneed in the groin by Sullivan, and ended the bout as a No Contest after a minute and a half of boxing in the third round. Santry had to be carried from the ring.

On March 18, 1903, Santry fought Adam Ryan to a ten-round draw in Indianapolis. On December 3, of the previous year he had fought Ryan to a six-round draw at the Rosemont Athletic Club in Chicago. Ryan was a lightweight from Philadelphia who would meet several contenders in his career and would face welterweight champion Harry Lewis three years later.

On October 29, 1903, Santry fought Aurelio Herrera in Anaconcda, Montana, losing in a thirteenth-round knockout. Santry later claimed he had led significantly in points throughout the bout and had been the victim of a knockout punch by Herrera while he was distracted. He had continued to train, running as much as five miles according to one source, and hitting the bag, even during this period of gradual decline in his boxing career. Herrera, who was a promising young boxer, had hurt his hands prior to the bout but had fought slightly fewer gifted opponents and taken subsequently less punishment. Both he and Santry were around twenty-seven, with Santry having only a slight advantage in reach.

=== Jailing ===
Santry fought Jack Cordell in San Francisco California on November 29, 1904, and lost in a ten-round points decision, which was unpopular with much of the crowd. Though he showed some of his old defensive skills, he lacked the punch he had shown in his earlier career. Many fans would have preferred a draw ruling for the bout.

After the bout with Cordell, Santry was arrested on a complaint by Battling Nelson, with whom he had sparred for several weeks, acting as a trainer. Nelson believed he had been defrauded out of receipts for his fights against Young Corbett and Jimmy Britt in San Francisco by Santry who had already left for the East coast with Nelson's manager Ted Murphy. The complaint applied to Murphey as well who had received $9000 from Nelson's San Francisco bouts. Santry was released on his own recognizance on Christmas Day, 1904 after claiming his innocence, and Murphy was released on bail claiming he had fully intended to compensate Nelson for the money owned him. Nelson did not choose to press charges. He was back to boxing with a knockout of Jack Parry in eleven rounds in Boston, the following April 10, 1905.

=== 1905–1911 ===
Fighting boxers of less than championship contender quality, Santry had a five match winning streak from Spring to October 1905.

On November 17, 1905, Santry fought Jack Dougherty, winning in six rounds in Milwaukee, Wisconsin. It was reported that he found Dougherty an easy opponent.

Santry knocked out Tommy Lynch on December 10, 1907, in Duluth, Minnesota, in four rounds, though Lynch was not a boxer who fought championship contenders.

On July 3, 1908, Santry fought Eddie Marino at The Rink in Sandpoint, Idaho to a twenty-round draw. The bout was a "smoker" for the Sandpoint Idaho Athletic Club and certainly drew a far smaller crowd than the ones he had drawn ten years earlier. He fought less frequently for the next seven years, until his last bout with Jack Ryan on May 12, 1911, which he won in a fourth-round knockout in South Bend, Indiana.

Santry worked during this period and later refereed fights in several locations, including Gary, Hammond, and Fort Wayne Indiana, as well as Davenport, Iowa.

== Political career ==
He retired from competitive prize fighting around 1911, but stayed active in the sport as a referee, and may have continued to act as a trainer or cornerman for boxers at times.

On November 8, 1914, he was elected to the Illinois House of Representatives from District 3 in Chicago, as a Democrat, at the age of 38, by a sweeping majority. He had previously held a position in the County building. He served for several years in the State Legislature and helped to sponsor a bill to administer legalized boxing in Illinois which he had submitted by 1915 as a member of the assembly. Much to his disappointment, the Carroll Bill he supported to administer legal boxing failed to pass the Illinois House of Representatives on May 27, 1915, five votes short of a majority. It had already failed to pass the State Senate.

As late as July 26, 1918, he was scheduled to act as a cornerman with his friend ex-champion middleweight Tommy Ryan for boxer Eddie McGoorty's bout with Harry Greb in Chicago.

He lost a run for Illinois State Representative in late 1918, causing him a great deal of disappointment, and according to a few sources, a "nervous breakdown".

== Personal life and death ==
On July 23, 1900, Santry married Miss Helen Marr of Chicago at the Hotel Majestic in Hammond, Indiana. Eddie's brother William attended the groom. The ceremony, performed by a Judge Stinson, was kept small to avoid public scrutiny, and not long after the ceremony, the couple returned to their hometown Chicago.

Santry died on January 28, 1919, aged 42, in Chicago. He had suffered from both emotional distress, and an illness for a year before his death.

== Boxing achievements ==
Achievements
Preceded by Ben Jordan	British World Featherweight Champion; October 10, 1899 – February 1, 1900	Succeeded by Terry McGovern; Reunited Championship
