= Ben Jordan (boxer) =

English boxer (1873–1945)

Personal information
- Nationality: British
- Born: 1 April 1873 Bermondsey, London
- Died: 18 January 1945 (aged 71)
- Height: 5 ft 5.5 in (1.66 m)
- Weight: Featherweight

Boxing career

Boxing record
- Total fights: 21
- Wins: 16
- Win by KO: 7
- Losses: 1
- Draws: 1
- No contests: 3

Ben Jordan (1 April 1873 –18 January 1945), was a British featherweight boxer who took the British World Featherweight Championship on 29 May 1899 in a ninth-round knockout against Harry Greenfield at the National Sporting Club in London, England. On 10 October 1899, Eddie Santry overtook the title defeating him at the Lenox Club in New York in a sixteenth of twenty-round knockout.

== Early life ==
Ben Jordan was born on 1 April 1873 in Bermondsey, London, the son of an English minister. According to one source, Jordan attended University College in London around 1890 at the age of seventeen and may have been a divinity student. His decision to pursue boxing as a career was not met with approval by his father. He fought a number of exhibitions around London prior to his completing his university education which caused a further rift from his strict father, and likely interfered with his completing his university studies.

He started his better publicized professional boxing career around the age of twenty-one by winning three short preliminary fights at the National Sporting Club in Convent Garden London on 28 January 1895 against Jack Gray, Sid Phillips, and Jim Whelan.

== Taking the British Featherweight Title in London ==
Jordan first challenged for the British Featherweight Title against American Tommy White of Chicago on 29 November 1897 at the National Sporting Club in London, England, winning in an eighteenth round disqualification. It was White's first appearance in England. They fought for a purse of 700 pounds or $3500 with a side bet of roughly $1,000.

Jordan met British boxer Eddie Curry for the British Featherweight Title on 4 April 1898 again at London's National Sporting Club, winning in a seventeenth round disqualification in a scheduled twenty-round match. According to the Los Angeles Herald, a purse of 300 British pounds was at stake, and the World Bantamweight championship was being contested.

=== Defeating George Dixon in New York ===
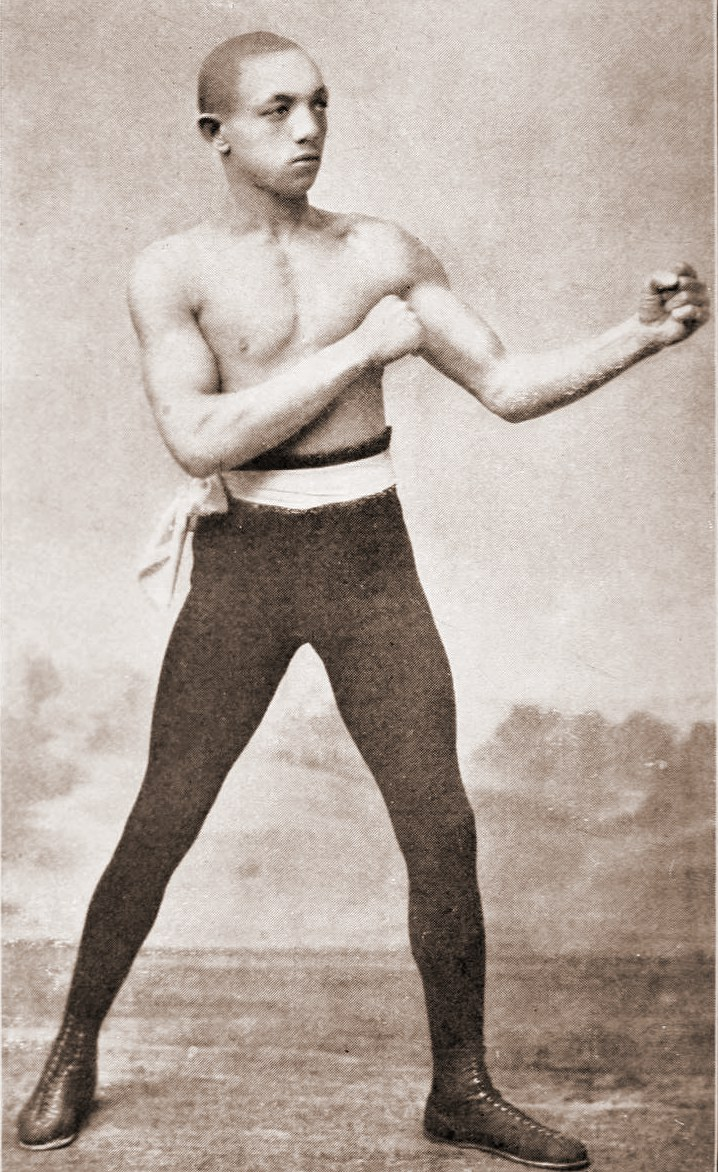
George Dixon

On 28 May 1898, Jordan arrived in New York from England aboard the RMS Lucania to face American challengers. The Luciana was one of the fastest, largest, and most luxurious passenger liners at the time. Jordan was 24 years old and fresh from his knockouts of Eddie Curry and Tommy White. He had been able to continue his training during his voyage including sparring and hitting the bag as well as daily runs aboard Luciana's spacious decks.

In a close bout, he defeated the great Canadian featherweight George Dixon on 1 July 1898 at New York's Lenox Club in a classic twenty five round points decision by referee Charley White. According to the San Francisco Chronicle, "Dixon did the leading but unlike many of those who had previously met the little Colored fighter, Jordan went at him and mixed it all the time." The bout was close, and many believed a draw would have been a better decision. Jordan was down on his hands and knees in the seventh from a blow by Dixon, but the bout contained relatively few knockdowns and no counts. The bout ended with a flurry by Dixon, but the referee did not feel it adequate to award him the decision. The Chronicle actually believed Dixon had the edge in the fighting. The Los Angeles Times also agreed the bout was close and that "Both men fought well and there was little to choose between them."

== Taking the British World Featherweight Title ==
On 29 May 1899, Jordan took the British World Featherweight Championship in a ninth-round knockout against Harry Greenfield at the National Sporting Club in London, England. At the time, the title was not recognized as a World Title in the United States, but it is listed by many sources today as a British World Title.

== Unsuccessful attempts to match Jordan with American champions ==
Attempts to match Jordan with the American champion Young Corbett II were not successful. The Young Corbett bout would have taken place in San Francisco around November 1903, and would have been a Featherweight World Championship. Talk of matching Jordan with the great American Terry McGovern around 1899 also never came to fruition. McGovern's representatives probably turned down the English fight as he was offered a purse of $2,500 after he had received offers as high as $15,000 to fight Young Corbett II in San Francisco.

== Losing the British World Featherweight Title ==
On 10 October 1899, Eddie Santry overtook the title defeating him at the Lenox Club in New York in a sixteenth of twenty-round knockout. Jordan was knocked out by a "clean right hand swing to the jaw". Santry achieved the knockout in a little less than two minutes into the sixteenth round. Until the knockout Jordan had been outpointing Santry, though he had been knocked down in the first round. Jordan had tired some by the sixteenth round. One source wrote that "until the knockout Jordan was far ahead on points but Santry's blows were truer to the mark and won him the battle." Santry had a slight advantage in height, though Jordan was a 2 to 1 favorite in the betting.

== Last trip to America and mid boxing career ==
On 28 May 1900, he defeated American boxer Tommy Hogan at the National Sporting Club in London in an impressive fourth-round knockout for a substantial purse of around $3,500.

On 18 August 1900, he again arrived in New York aboard the RMS Lucania expecting to meet the great Terry McGovern in a fight that would draw a substantial audience, but his hopes were dashed when McGovern's representatives chose not to face the British champion. McGovern also claimed to have been tied up with acting engagements, much to the consternation of Jordan, who wrote a letter of protest to a London newspaper, claiming "he went to America to meet a fighter but he found him to be an actor who had no time to waste on ring engagements."

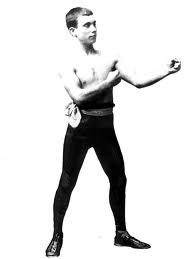
Pedlar Palmer

On 20 June 1901, Jordan was reported as suffering from a bout of malarial fever and was unable to make another planned trip to the United States. He had suffered from the same illness during a previous trip to the United States, and it may have affected his decision to refrain from boxing abroad after 1900.

On 23 June 1902, he defeated Kid McFadden at the National Sporting Club in London in a fifteenth-round knockout.

He would defeat George Dixon for a second time on 2 May 1903 in London in a six-round points decision.

He successfully defended the English Featherweight Title on 12 December 1904 against champion Pedlar Palmer in an important bout at the National Sporting Club in London in a fifteen-round points decision.

He continued to box until 1907 meeting Johnny Summers three times in 1906 and 1907 in London for short three round no contest bouts.

He died on 18 January 1945, at the age of 71, apparently not seriously affected by previous bouts of what was reported as malarial fever.

== Boxing achievements ==
Achievements
Preceded by Ben Jordan	British World Featherweight Champion; May 29, 1899 – October 10, 1899	Succeeded by Eddie Santry
