= Pedlar Palmer =

English boxer (1876–1949)

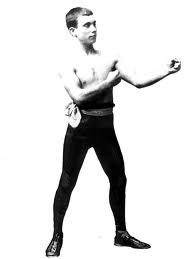

Personal information
- Nickname: Box O'Tricks
- Nationality: English
- Born: Thomas Palmer; 19 November 1876 Canning Town, London
- Died: 13 February 1949 (aged 72) Brighton
- Height: 5 ft 3 in (1.60 m)
- Weight: Bantamweight

Boxing career
- Reach: 64 in (163 cm)

Boxing record
- Total fights: 70
- Wins: 51
- Win by KO: 13
- Losses: 15
- Draws: 4

Pedlar Palmer, born Thomas Palmer, (1876 – 13 February 1949) was an English boxer who held the world bantamweight championship from 1895 to 1899.

== Life ==
Palmer was born in Canning Town, London on 19 November 1876. His father was a bare-knuckle champion of Essex, and rumour had it that his mother could take on and beat any woman in London's East End. As a boxer, Palmer soon gained the nickname "Box o' Tricks", reflecting his showmanship - he and his brother had taken part in a stage act as children and Palmer utilised some of the things he had learned on stage in the boxing ring.

In 1893, Palmer won bouts advertised as the "World 100lb" title against Walter Croot and Mike Small, and became World Bantamweight Champion in 1895 when he beat Billy Plimmer of Birmingham on a 14th round foul. He boxed a draw with the World Featherweight Champion George Dixon in New York in 1896. He kept his bantamweight title through five defences against Johnny Murphy, Ernie Stanton. Dave Sullivan, Billy Plimmer, and Billy Rochford.

Palmer met Irish-born American boxer Dave Sullivan in London on 18 October 1897 in what was billed as a World 116 pound Title Match. It would be Sullivan's first loss according to most sources. Sullivan failed to receive the twenty round points decision, but established himself as the primary contender for the World Featherweight Title.

== Loss of World Bantamweight Title to Terry McGovern ==
Palmer lost his title in Tuckahoe, New York in September 1899. He was knocked out in the first round by Terrible Terry McGovern - Palmer claimed that he had been blinded by the lights. Having held the Championship for four years, Palmer was still only 22 years old.

== Loss of the British Bantamweight Title ==
In November 1900 Palmer lost the British bantamweight title to Harry Ware, and although he won two out of three fights with George Dixon and beat Digger Stanley, another world champion, he was twice beaten in British featherweight title fights by Ben Jordan and Joe Bowker.

Jordan successfully defended the English Featherweight Title on 12 December 1904 against Palmer in an important bout at the National Sporting Club in London in a fifteen-round points decision.

Palmer was a heavy drinker. In April 1907 he killed Robert Croat on a train to Epsom races, for which crime he was convicted of manslaughter and sentenced to five years in prison. On his release he boxed again, but never enjoyed his earlier levels of success. For the last 20 years of his life he was a bookmaker in Brighton, where he died on 13 February 1949, aged 72. He is buried on the western edge of Brighton; the gravestone no longer stands.

== Professional boxing record ==
70 fights	51 wins	15 losses
By knockout	13	9
By decision	33	5
By disqualification	5	1
Draws	4	

No.	Result	Record	Opponent	Type	Round	Date	Location	Notes
70	Loss	51–15–4	Jim Driscoll	TKO	4 (10)	Mar 10, 1919	Hoxton Music Hall, Hoxton, London, England, U.K.	
69	Loss	51–14–4	Digger Stanley	RTD	4 (10)	Nov 19, 1914	West London Stadium, London, England, U.K.	
68	Loss	51–13–4	Jim Lloyd	RTD	4 (10)	Aug 1, 1912	Liverpool Stadium, Pudsey Street, Liverpool, Merseyside, England, U.K.	
67	Win	51–12–4	Sam Russell	DQ	3 (10)	Jul 25, 1912	Premierland, Whitechapel, London, England, U.K.	
66	Win	50–12–4	George Moore	RTD	7 (10)	Mar 25, 1912	National Sporting Club, Covent Garden, London, England, U.K.	
65	Win	49–12–4	George Moore	DQ	5 (10)	Mar 2, 1912	Premierland, Whitechapel, London, England, U.K.	
64	Win	48–12–4	Alec Lambert	PTS	6	Jan 24, 1912	Premierland, Whitechapel, London, England, U.K.	
63	Win	47–12–4	Darkey Haley	PTS	6	Jan 6, 1912	Premierland, Whitechapel, London, England, U.K.	
62	Loss	46–12–4	Darkey Haley	KO	10 (15)	Dec 7, 1906	Pitfield Street Baths, Hoxton, London, England, U.K.	
61	Win	46–11–4	Cockney Cohen	DQ	4 (20)	May 28, 1906	Drill Hall, Plymouth, Devon, England, U.K.	
60	Win	45–11–4	Driver William Himphen	PTS	6	Apr 28, 1906	Wonderland, Mile End, London, England, U.K.	
59	Draw	44–11–4	Cockney Cohen	PTS	15	Mar 26, 1906	Wonderland, Mile End, London, England, U.K.	
58	Loss	44–11–3	Charlie Lampey	PTS	15	Feb 28, 1906	Sporting and Dramatic Club, Charing Cross, London, England, U.K.	
57	Loss	44–10–3	Cockney Cohen	KO	6 (20)	Nov 13, 1905	Wonderland, Mile End, London, England, U.K.	Cohen claims English 122 lbs title
56	Win	44–9–3	Cockney Cohen	PTS	15	Sep 25, 1905	Wonderland, Mile End, London, England, U.K.	
55	Win	43–9–3	Bob White	KO	6 (15)	Aug 5, 1905	The Circus, West Hartlepool, County Durham, England, U.K.	
54	Win	42–9–3	George Moore	PTS	6	Jun 17, 1905	Wonderland, Mile End, London, England, U.K.	
53	Draw	41–9–3	George Moore	PTS	15	May 29, 1905	Wonderland, Mile End, London, England, U.K.	For vacant NSC British and English featherweight titles
52	Loss	41–9–2	Joe Bowker	TKO	12 (15)	Mar 20, 1905	National Sporting Club, Covent Garden, London, England, U.K.	For vacant NSC British and English featherweight titles
51	Loss	41–8–2	Ben Jordan	PTS	15	Dec 12, 1904	National Sporting Club, Covent Garden, London, England, U.K.	For NSC British and English featherweight titles
50	Win	41–7–2	Young Joseph	PTS	15	Oct 17, 1904	Wonderland, Mile End, London, England, U.K.	
49	Win	40–7–2	WJ (Watty) Austin	PTS	20	Aug 8, 1904	Camps Bay Pavilion, Cape Town, Western Cape, South Africa	
48	Draw	39–7–2	WJ (Watty) Austin	PTS	20	Jul 4, 1904	Camps Bay Pavilion, Cape Town, Western Cape, South Africa	
47	Win	39–7–1	Dan Hyman	RTD	9 (20)	May 23, 1904	Wanderers Hall, Johannesburg, Gauteng, South Africa	
46	Loss	38–7–1	Harry Alexander	DQ	4 (15)	Mar 25, 1904	Britannia Theatre, Hoxton, London, England, U.K.	
45	Win	38–6–1	Harry Alexander	KO	4 (15)	Mar 14, 1904	Boulevard Football Ground, Hull, Yorkshire, England, U.K.	
44	Loss	37–6–1	George Dixon	PTS	20	Nov 9, 1904	Ginnetts Circus, Newcastle, Tyne and Wear, England, U.K.	Billed world 120lbs title
43	Win	37–5–1	Jim Williams	PTS	20	Oct 23, 1903	New National Athletic Club, Marylebone, London, England, U.K.	
42	Win	36–5–1	Spike Robson	PTS	20	Sep 14, 1903	Ginnetts Circus, Newcastle, Tyne and Wear, London, England, U.K.	Billed English 124 lbs title; Not generally recognised as over 2-minute rounds
41	Win	35–5–1	George Dixon	PTS	8	Jun 27, 1903	Wonderland, Mile End, London, England, U.K.	
40	Win	34–5–1	Digger Stanley	PTS	12	May 11, 1903	Wonderland, Mile End, London, England, U.K.	
39	Win	33–5–1	Fred Delaney	PTS	6	Apr 2, 1903	Barking Public Hall, Barking Road, Canning Town, London, England, U.K.	
38	Win	32–5–1	Harry Ware	PTS	12	Feb 16, 1903	Wonderland, Mile End, London, England, U.K.	Billed English 8st 8lbs title
37	Loss	31–5–1	Will Curley	KO	8 (15)	Dec 15, 1902	Ginnetts Circus, Newcastle, Tyne and Wear, England, U.K.	
36	Win	31–4–1	Jim Williams	PTS	20	Oct 23, 1902	The National AC, Marylebone, London, England, U.K.	
35	Win	30–4–1	George Dixon	PTS	15	Sep 8, 1902	New National Athletic Club, Marylebone, London, England, U.K.	
34	Win	29–4–1	Digger Stanley	PTS	10	Jun 16, 1902	Wonderland, Mile End, London, England, U.K.	
33	Loss	28–4–1	Jim Williams	KO	2 (15)	Jan 27, 1902	National Sporting Club, Covent Garden, London, England, U.K.	For vacant NSC bantamweight title claim
32	Loss	28–3–1	Harry Harris	PTS	15	Mar 18, 1901	National Sporting Club, Covent Garden, London, England, U.K.	For vacant world bantamweight title
31	Loss	28–2–1	Harry Ware	PTS	20	Nov 12, 1900	National Sporting Club, Covent Garden, London, England, U.K.	Lost NSC bantamweight title
30	Win	28–1–1	Harry Ware	PTS	15	May 28, 1900	National Sporting Club, Covent Garden, London, England, U.K.	Retained NSC bantamweight title
29	Loss	27–1–1	Terry McGovern	KO	1 (20)	Sep 12, 1899	Westchester A.C., Tuckahoe, New York, U.S.	Lost world bantamweight title claim; For vacant world bantamweight title
28	Win	27–0–1	Billy Rotchford	DQ	3 (20)	Apr 17, 1899	National Sporting Club, Covent Garden, London, England, U.K.	Retained world bantamweight title claim
27	Win	26–0–1	Billy Plimmer	TKO	17 (20)	Dec 12, 1898	National Sporting Club, Covent Garden, London, England, U.K.	Retained world bantamweight title claim; Won vacant NSC bantamweight title
26	Win	25–0–1	Dave Sullivan	PTS	20	Oct 18, 1897	National Sporting Club, Covent Garden, London, England, U.K.	Retained world bantamweight title claim
25	Win	24–0–1	Ernie Stanton	TKO	14 (20)	Jan 25, 1897	National Sporting Club, Covent Garden, London, England, U.K.	Retained world bantamweight title claim
24	Win	23–0–1	Johnny Murphy	PTS	20	Oct 12, 1896	National Sporting Club, Covent Garden, London, England, U.K.	Made a world bantamweight title claim
23	Win	22–0–1	Ted Willis	RTD	4 (10)	Apr 13, 1896	National Sporting Club, Covent Garden, London, England, U.K.	
22	Win	21–0–1	Ted Willis	KO	2 (6)	Mar 31, 1896	Ned Donnelly's Rooms (over a saddlers shop), London, England, U.K.	
21	Draw	20–0–1	George Dixon	PTS	6	Jan 30, 1896	Madison Square Garden, New York City, New York, U.S.	
20	Win	20–0	Billy Plimmer	DQ	14 (20)	Nov 25, 1895	National Sporting Club, Covent Garden, London, England, U.K.	Won NSC British flyweight and world 112lbs titles
19	Win	19–0	Ginger Walters	KO	7 (8)	Oct 27, 1894	Bermondsey School of Arms, Bermondsey, London, England, U.K.	
18	Win	18–0	Ernie Stanton	PTS	20	Oct 15, 1894	National Sporting Club, Covent Garden, London, England, U.K.	Retained NSC British light flyweight title; Billed English 108lbs title
17	Win	17–0	Bill Mortimer	TKO	5 (20)	Jun 25, 1894	National Sporting Club, Covent Garden, London, England, U.K.	Won vacant NSC British light flyweight title; Won English 106lbs title claim
16	Win	16–0	Young Edwards	TKO	2 (3)	Apr 16, 1894	National Sporting Club, Covent Garden, London, England, U.K.	
15	Win	15–0	Ted Wood	PTS	6	Feb 19, 1894	National Sporting Club, Covent Garden, London, England, U.K.	
14	Win	14–0	Albert Gould	PTS	6	Dec 11, 1892	National Sporting Club, Covent Garden, London, England, U.K.	
13	Win	13–0	Albert Gould	TKO	2 (6)	Dec 4, 1892	National Sporting Club, Covent Garden, London, England, U.K.	
12	Win	12–0	Mike Small	PTS	6	May 29, 1892	National Sporting Club, Covent Garden, London, England, U.K.	
11	Win	11–0	Walter Croot	KO	17 (20)	May 1, 1892	National Sporting Club, Covent Garden, London, England, U.K.	Won NSC British minimumweight title
10	Win	10–0	George Wood	PTS	?	Sep 1, 1892	United Kingdom	Date Unknown
9	Win	9–0	Dick Edwards	PTS	?	Aug 1, 1892	United Kingdom	Date Unknown
8	Win	8–0	Ted Sounders	PTS	?	Jul 1, 1892	United Kingdom	Date Unknown
7	Win	7–0	Will Morse	PTS	?	Jun 1, 1892	United Kingdom	Date Unknown
6	Win	6–0	Ginger Wright	PTS	?	May 1, 1892	United Kingdom	Date Unknown
5	Win	5–0	Tom Shane	PTS	?	Apr 1, 1892	United Kingdom	Date Unknown
4	Win	4–0	Ernie Stanton	PTS	3	Mar 1, 1892	Plaistow, London, England, U.K.	Exact date unknown
3	Win	3–0	Arthur Wigg	PTS	?	Feb 1, 1892	United Kingdom	Date Unknown
2	Win	2–0	San Swamburg	PTS	?	Jan 1, 1892	United Kingdom	Date Unknown
1	Win	1–0	WC Bond	PTS	11	Jan 1, 1891	United Kingdom	Date Unknown
