= Tommy Spider Kelly =

American boxer

Tommy Kelly
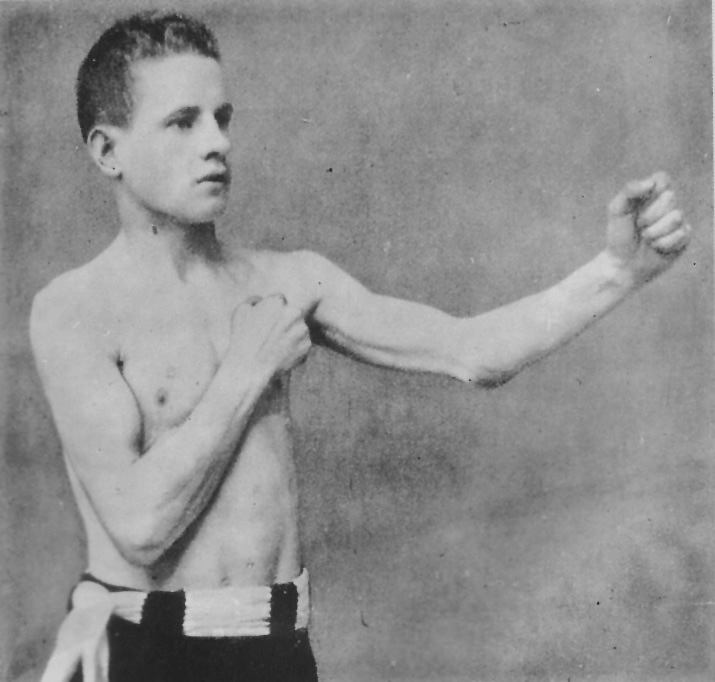

Personal information
- Nickname: Harlem Spider
- Born: Tommy Kelly; September 6, 1867 New York, Manhattan, US
- Died: January 4, 1927 (aged 59) New York, Manhattan, US
- Height: 5 ft 4 in (163 cm)
- Weight: Bantamweight

Boxing career

Boxing record
- Total fights: 51
- Wins: 37
- Win by KO: 17
- Losses: 7
- Draws: 6
- No contests: 1

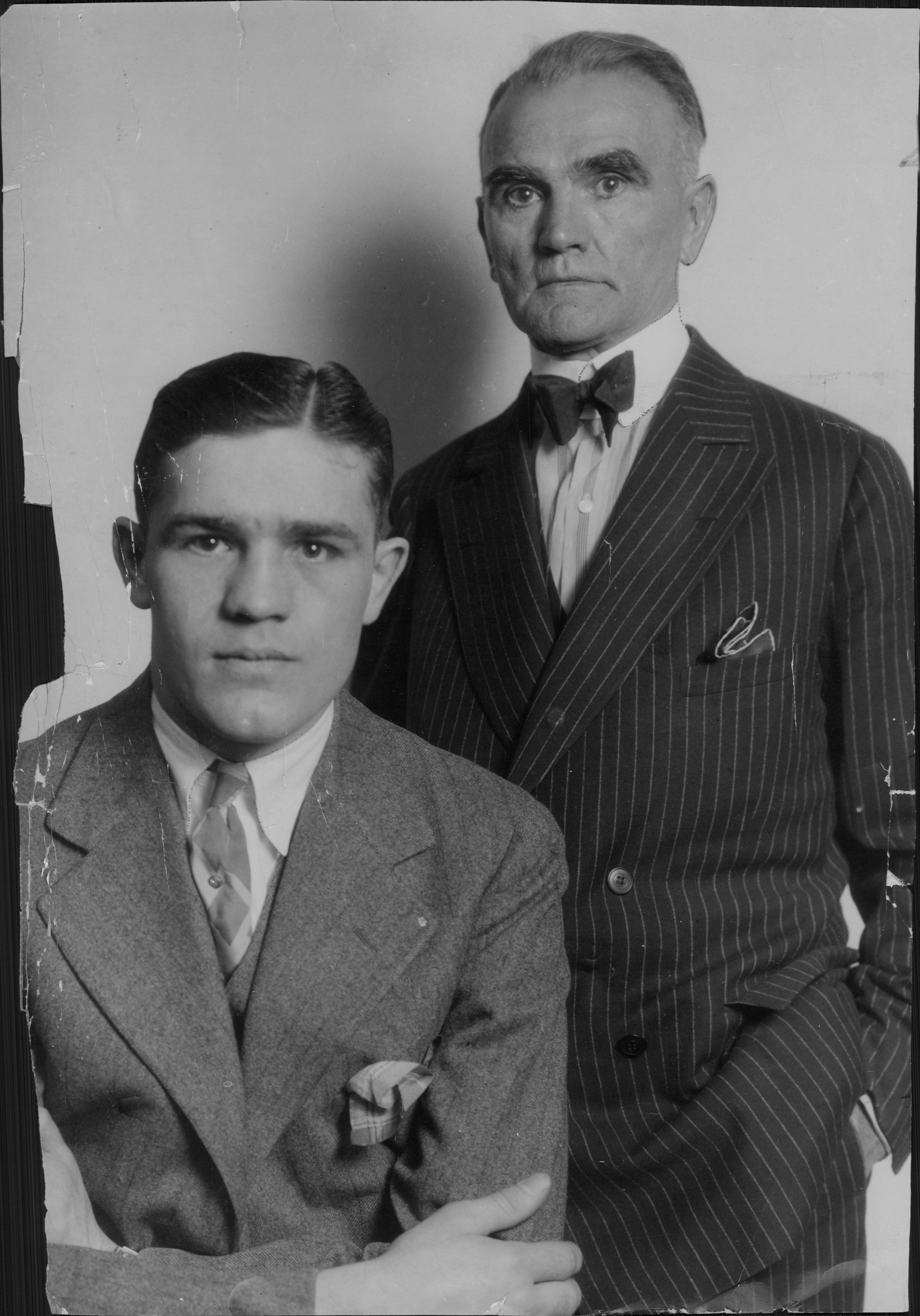
Kelly (right) in 1927

Tommy "Spider" Kelly (September 6, 1867 – January 4, 1927) was a Harlem, New York boxer (nicknamed "The Harlem Spider"), and the world champion bantamweight fighter between 1890 and 1892. He was the first New York-born champion since the Marquess of Queensberry rules were adopted.

The professional career of Spider Kelly as a boxer began in 1887 when he knocked out Larry Boylan, with Boylan being removed from the ring unconscious.

Continuing to win his fights, at the end of 1887, Kelly claimed the title of American bantam-weight champion, having defeated Tommy Russell. In early 1888, Kelly fought a draw against George Dixon and then obtained his first victory over Michael Chappie Moran, who would later become his greatest career rival.

In a second match with Moran, in an 1889 fight that was billed as a world title bantam-weight fight, Kelly was victorious, allowing him to claim the world bantam-weight title. However, only a few months later, in his third duel against Moran, Kelly was defeated and the world title went to Moran.

Nevertheless, in early 1890, Kelly and Moran fought a fourth time. Kelly managed to serve a definitive knockout to his rival during this match, as Kelly laid Moran out on the canvas within a time of 38 minutes. Kelly held on to his world bantam-weight title until 1892, when he was dethroned by Englishman Billy Plimmer in 10 rounds at Coney Island.

After losing his title to Plimmer, Kelly fought - through a hard series of defeats - Tim Murphy (3 times), Maxie Haugh, Kid Gleason, Frank Brierley, Harry Fisher, Casper Leon, and Fred Mayo.

Finally, after a discouraging nine years of on and off fighting with just three wins to eight losses, Kelly decided to retire in 1901 after four consecutive draws against the light-weight fighter, Kid Goodman.

After boxing, Kelly obtained a civil service position with the New York City Streets Department.

== The Sun Also Rises ==
In the novel The Sun Also Rises, Spider Kelly teaches Robert Cohn how to box and flattens his nose in a fight.
