= T. J. M. Kelley =

American physician and politician (1855–1912)

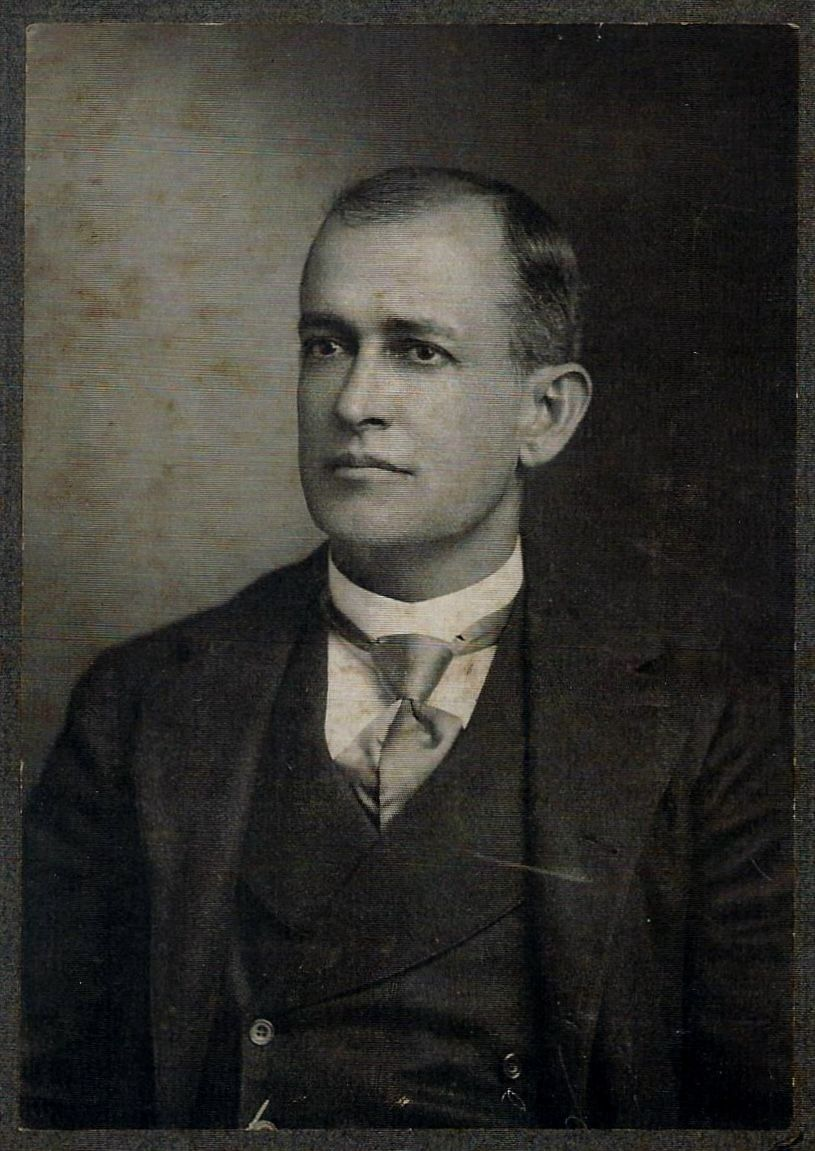

Member of the Georgia House of Representatives from Glascock County
- In office October 24, 1900 – August 15, 1906
- Preceded by: J. W. Whiteley
- Succeeded by: William A. Gibson

Personal details
- Born: Thomas Jefferson Marion Kelley; April 15, 1855 Gibson, Georgia, U.S.
- Died: October 10, 1912 (aged 57) Gibson, Georgia, U.S.
- Resting place: Gibson Cemetery
- Party: Democratic
- Spouse: Ida V. Logue (m. 1881; died 1884) Mollie S. Logue (m. 1884; died 1909)
- Parent: George W. Kelley
- Relatives: Andie MacDowell (great-grandniece)
- Education: University of Maryland School of Medicine; Medical College of Georgia (M.D.)
- Profession: Physician, politician

Thomas Jefferson Marion Kelley Sr. (April 15, 1855 – October 10, 1912) was an American physician and politician who represented Glascock County in the Georgia House of Representatives from 1900 to 1906.

== Early life and education ==
Thomas Jefferson Marion Kelley was born on April 15, 1855, in Gibson, Georgia, the third of ten children of George Washington Kelley (Note: In some sources, his father is referred to as James Kelley.) (1828–1907), a farmer, millman, merchant, lumber trader, and Confederate States Army Civil War veteran. His father, a Georgia native, was described as having been active in the development of Glascock County, Georgia, and Alachua County, Florida.

Kelley was raised and educated primarily in Sandersville, Georgia, first studying medicine under his older brother, J. L. Kelley. He completed one course at the University of Maryland School of Medicine and a second at the Medical College of Georgia, graduating with an M.D. in 1880.

== Career ==
In the 1880s, Kelley built a Gothic Revival house in Gibson, where he situated his medical practice. In 1900, he was elected to represent Glascock County in the Georgia House of Representatives, and assumed office on October 24 and left in 1906. Kelley supported a platform of tax cuts and ballot reform.

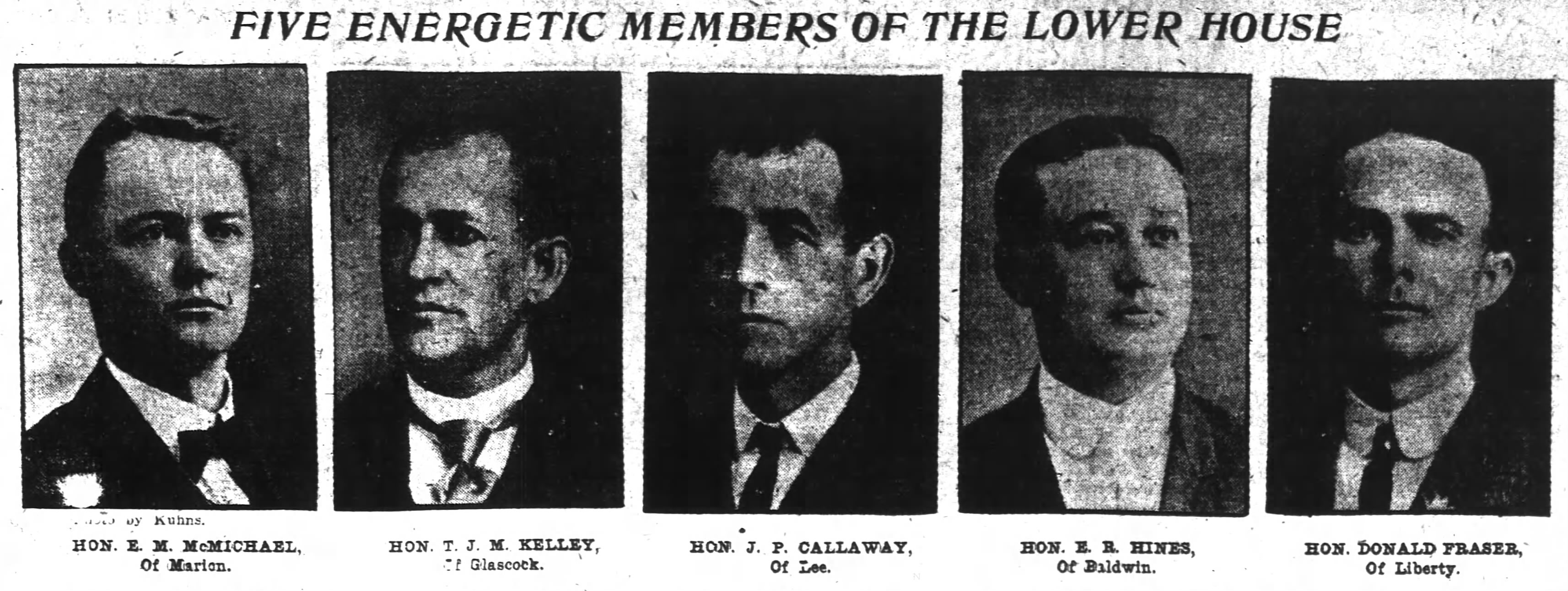
"Five Energetic Members of the Lower House," as listed in the August 11, 1906 edition of The Atlanta Constitution

== Personal life ==
On November 10, 1881, Kelley married Ida V. Logue in Glascock County. After Ida's death in 1884, he married her cousin, Mollie S. Logue, on October 1, 1884 in Glascock County. His children included Lillian, Thomas J. M. Jr., Louis, Harry, Fred, and Mary Bessie. He was a member of Woodmen of the World. In about 1910, Kelley contracted paralysis after suffering a mini-stroke, leaving his speech seriously affected. Kelley died at 4:15 a.m. on October 10, 1912, at his residence in Gibson. His funeral was held at Gibson Baptist Church on October 11, and he was afterwards interred at Gibson Cemetery.

== Sources ==
- F. A. Battey and Company (1889). Biographical Souvenir of the States of Georgia and Florida. F. A. Battey and Company. ISBN 9780893080402.
- Loyless, Thomas W. (1902). Georgia's Public Men 1902-1904. Byrd Printing. ISBN 9781019884829.
