= Augusta Southern Railroad =

The Augusta Southern Railroad (reporting mark AUS) was established on May 1, 1893, through a reorganization of the Augusta, Gibson & Sandersville Railroad.

The railroad acquired the Sandersville & Tennille Railroad in 1894 and then in 1897 was leased by the South Carolina & Georgia Railroad. The lease ended in 1901 at which time the Southern Railway took control.

The Georgia & Florida Railway acquired control of the Augusta Southern in about 1918, and purchased the property directly on October 31, 1919. Part of the line was abandoned in 1934; the remaining portion is operated by Norfolk Southern Railway north of Hephzibah, Georgia.
