= Thomas Kelly (footballer, fl. 1900s) =

English footballer

Personal information
- Position: Wing half

Senior career*
Years	Team	Apps	(Gls)
1904–1905	Seaham White Star		
1905–1906	Sunderland	1	(0)
1906–1907	Murton Red Star		
1907–1908	Seaham Albion		
1908–19??	Seaham Harbour		
- * Club domestic league appearances and goals

Thomas Kelly was an English professional footballer who played as a wing half for Sunderland.
