= Thomas Kelly (sailor) =

Recipient of the George Cross

- Born: 19 March 1928; Newry, County Down, Northern Ireland
- Died: 18 March 1947 (aged 18); Bay of Biscay
- Military career
- Allegiance: United Kingdom
- Branch: British Merchant Navy
- Service years: 1942–1947
- Rank: Able Seaman
- Conflicts: Second World War
- Awards: George Cross

Thomas Raymond Kelly, GC (19 March 1928 – 18 March 1947) was a Northern Irish sailor in the British Merchant Navy who was posthumously awarded the George Cross for the courage he displayed in the Bay of Biscay, when he lost his own life saving people from drowning during a storm.

== Early life ==
Known as Raymond Kelly, he was born in Newry, County Down, the eldest of six children. He had two brothers and three sisters. His father, Robert Kelly, was also a seaman and died at age 37. During the Second World War, Kelly left school at age 14, and in May 1942 he joined the SS Rowan.

== George Cross ==
Kelly was serving on board S.S. Empire Plover when a nearby vessel, S.S. Famagusta, began to founder in a storm. Empire Plover responded to the S.O.S. but a lifeboat launched by the stricken vessel capsized, throwing its ten occupants into the water. As the men of Empire Plover lowered ropes and two crew members climbed down the scrambling nets to assist, Kelly swam with a line to the people struggling in the turbulent water and rescued a badly injured officer. He returned again to drag another man to safety but on his third foray he and the woman he was rescuing were swamped by a wave and disappeared. Five of the lifeboat's occupants were rescued in all.

Kelly's award was announced in the London Gazette of 6 February 1948, with the following citation:

Kelly showed a very high order of bravery and it was due to his determined and gallant action that two lives were saved. Each time he left the Empire Plover he risked his life To leave his ship on the third occasion, with the full knowledge which his first two rescues must have given him of the risk and difficulty of his undertaking and in the face of the bodily fatigue which those rescues must have entailed, was an act of supreme gallantry.
