= Gibson, Georgia =

- City
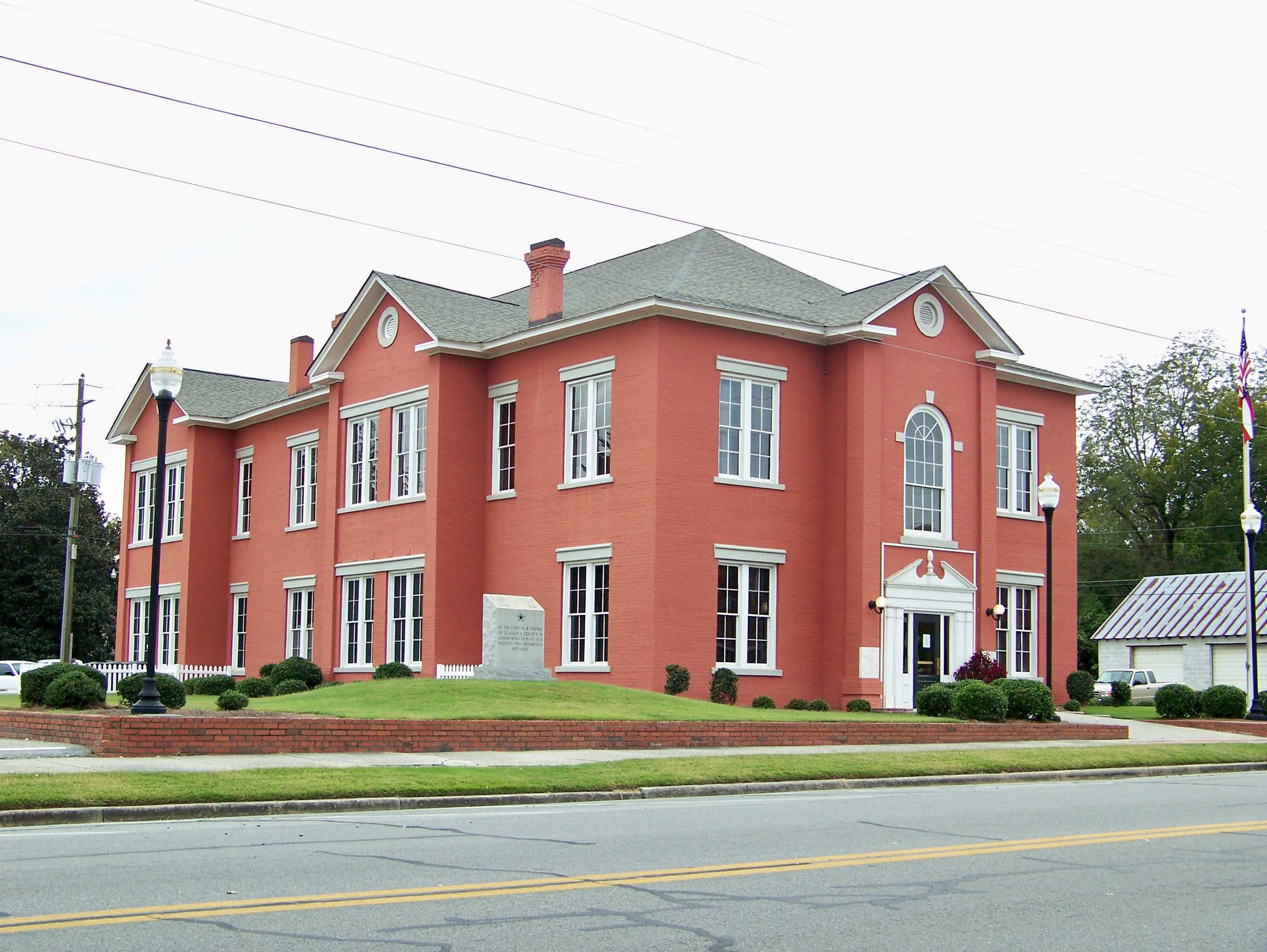
- Glascock County Courthouse in Gibson

- Location in Glascock County and the state of Georgia
- Coordinates: 33°13′58″N 82°35′43″W
- Country: United States
- State: Georgia
- County: Glascock
- Named for: William Gibson

Area
  - Total: 1.04 sq mi (2.69 km^{2})
  - Land: 1.02 sq mi (2.65 km^{2})
  - Water: 0.015 sq mi (0.04 km^{2})
- Elevation: 348 ft (106 m)

Population (2020)
  - Total: 630
  - Density: 615/sq mi (237.4/km^{2})
- Time zone: UTC-5 (Eastern (EST))
  - Summer (DST): UTC-4 (EDT)
- ZIP code: 30810
- Area code: 706
- FIPS code: 13-32748
- GNIS feature ID: 0331807

Gibson is a city and the county seat of Glascock County, Georgia, United States, and is home to the Glascock County Courthouse, a National Register of Historic Places listed site. The population was 663 at the 2010 census, and 630 in 2020.

Gibson's name was derived from Judge William Gibson, a former Confederate colonel and commanding officer of the 48th Georgia, who donated $500 for Glascock County's first public building, the courthouse.

== History ==
Gibson was founded in 1858 as the seat of the newly formed Glascock County. It was incorporated as a town in 1913 and as a city in 1943.

== Geography ==
Gibson is located slightly northeast of the center of Glascock County at 33°13′58″N 82°35′43″W (33.232737, -82.595301). Georgia State Routes 102 and 171 cross in the center of town. GA 102 leads west 6 miles (10 km) to Mitchell and east 10 miles (16 km) to Stapleton, while GA 171 leads north 13 miles (21 km) to Warrenton and south 24 miles (39 km) to Louisville. Augusta, 44 miles (71 km) to the northeast, is the closest large city.

According to the United States Census Bureau, Gibson has a total area of 1.0 square mile (2.7 km^{2}), of which 0.02 square miles (0.04 km^{2}), or 1.41%, is water. Rocky Comfort Creek, a southeast-flowing tributary of the Ogeechee River, passes through the northern part of Gibson.

== Demographics ==
Historical population
Census	Pop.	Note	%±
1880	123		—
1890	197		60.2%
1900	293		48.7%
1910	367		25.3%
1920	462		25.9%
1930	442		−4.3%
1940	474		7.2%
1950	460		−3.0%
1960	479		4.1%
1970	701		46.3%
1980	730		4.1%
1990	679		−7.0%
2000	694		2.2%
2010	663		−4.5%
2020	630		−5.0%
U.S. Decennial Census

As of the 2020 census, its population was 630.

== Education ==
=== Glascock County School District ===
The Glascock County School District holds pre-school to grade twelve, in a consolidated school under one roof. The district has 42 full-time teachers and over 568 students.

== Notable people ==
- T. J. M. Kelley, Physician and politician

== See also ==
- Central Savannah River Area
