= Red Kelly (musician) =

American jazz musician (1927–2004)

Thomas Raymond "Red" Kelly (August 29, 1927 in Shelby, Montana – June 9, 2004 in Tacoma, Washington) was an American jazz double-bassist.

Kelly initially took lessons on drums, but he was unable to work the hi-hat because polio had inhibited the use of his feet. He switched to double-bass instead as a teenager and in 1949 began playing bass in a big band led by Charlie Jackson. In the early 1950s he toured with Charlie Barnet, Herbie Fields, Claude Thornhill, and Red Norvo. It was working with Norvo that led to the alias "Red"; Kelly and bassist Red Mitchell were living in the same apartment, and when Norvo called Mitchell to invite him to tour, he got Kelly on the phone instead.

Kelly played with Woody Herman for several years, including on a 1954 tour of Europe, and around this time Kelly also recorded with Dick Collins and Nat Pierce. He then relocated to the West Coast, playing briefly in Seattle and then in Los Angeles with Maynard Ferguson, Med Flory, Stan Kenton, and Lennie Niehaus. He was a member of the Modest Jazz Trio with Red Mitchell and Jim Hall, who recorded an album in 1960, and worked with Harry James for most of the 1960s. Later in his life he moved to Tacoma, where he left the music business and ran his own jazz club, Kelly's. Kelly’s closed shortly before his death, in 2003.

With Bobby Scott, Frank Socolow, and Kenny Hume, Kelly was part of a jazz quartet that played at the side of the stage during the Broadway performances of "A Taste of Honey," at the Lyceum Theatre, October 3, 1960, through September 9 1961.

== Sources ==
- Barry Kernfeld, "Red Kelly". The New Grove Dictionary of Jazz, 2nd edition, 2001. (Updated version at Oxford Music Online)
