= Harry Harris =

Harry Harris may refer to:

- Harry Harris (American football) (1895–1969), American football player
- Harry Harris (boxer) (1880–1959), American boxer
- Harry Harris (director) (1922–2009), American television director
- Harry Harris (footballer) (1933–2004), Welsh footballer
- Harry Harris (geneticist) (1919–1994), British biochemist and geneticist
- Harry B. Harris Jr. (born 1956), admiral in the United States Navy and a US ambassador to South Korea
- Harry L. Harris (1927–2013), American politician
- Harry Harris, character in Uncle Tom's Cabin
- Richard Harris (anaesthetist) (born 1964), Australian cave diver and anaesthetist
- Samuel Henry Harris (1881–1936), Australian surgeon

== See also ==
- Henry Harris (disambiguation)
- Harold Harris (disambiguation)
