= Samuel Harris =

Samuel Harris may refer to:

- Samuel Harris (boxer) (born 1934), Pakistani Olympic boxer
- Samuel Harris (historian) (1682–1733), English clergyman and academic
- Samuel Harris (theologian) (1814–1899), American theologian, fifth president of Bowdoin College
- Samuel Harris (bailiff) (1815–1905), Manx advocate and philanthropist, High Bailiff of Douglas, Isle of Man
- Samuel Harris (Newfoundland merchant) (1850–1926), Newfoundland mariner and merchant
- Samuel Henry Harris (1881–1936), Australian surgeon
- Samuel Smith Harris (1841–1888), bishop of the Diocese of Michigan
- Sammy Harris, American baseball player

== See also ==
- Sam Harris (disambiguation)
