= Henry Harris =

Henry Harris may refer to:

== Arts and entertainment ==
- Henry Harris (actor) (1634–1704), English actor and theatre manager
- Henry B. Harris (1866–1912), Broadway producer and theatre owner
- Henry Harris (cinematographer) (1899–1971), British cinematographer

== Politics ==
- Henry R. Harris (Maryland politician) (died 1878), American politician from Maryland
- Henry R. Harris (1828–1909), U.S. Representative from Georgia
- Henry S. Harris (1850–1902), United States Representative from New Jersey
- Sir Henry Percy Harris (1856–1941), British Conservative Member of Parliament for Paddington South, 1910–1922

== Sports ==
- Henry Harris (English cricketer) (1854–1923), English cricketer
- Henry Harris (Australian cricketer) (1865–1933), Australian cricketer
- Henry Harris (ice hockey) (1905–1975), Canadian ice hockey player
- Henry Harris (baseball) (fl. 1920s–1930s), Negro league baseball player
- Henry Harris (American football) (born c. 1965), American college football player
- Hank Harris (American football) (1923–1999), born Henry Harris, Washington Redskins player

== Other ==
- Henry Harris (anatomist) (1885–1968), Professor of Anatomy at Cambridge University
- Henry Ellis Harris (1902–1977), American stamp dealer
- Sir Henry Harris (scientist) (1925–2014), Australian pioneer in oncology and human genetics
- Henry Silton Harris (1926–2007), British-Canadian philosopher

== See also ==
- Harry Harris (disambiguation)
- Hank Harris, American actor
