= Terry Sweeney (hang glider) =

American hang glider pioneer and musician

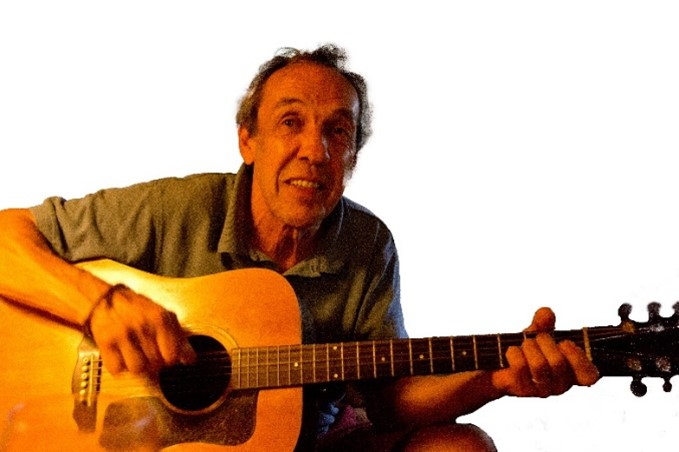
- Terry Sweeney c. 2014
- Born: Terry Sweeney; December 6, 1947 (age 78); Grasmere, New Hampshire, U.S.
- Known for: Hang glider designer for Sky Sports; Pioneering hang gliding instructor and pilot; Sweeney’s Glider, 1971 classic hang gliding video
- Spouse: Lisa Lapin
- Relatives: Patsy Sweeney (great uncle)

Terry Sweeney (born December 6, 1947) is an American inventor and hang glider pioneer. He designed hang gliders and equipment for Sky Sports and was a founding member and leader of many musical groups including Sweeney's Glider, Fly by Day, and Tam and the Bourines.

== Early life ==
Terry Sweeney was born in Grasmere, New Hampshire, on December 6, 1947, and raised in Dunbarton, New Hampshire. He was the youngest of the four children of John Sweeney, a laborer, and Charlotte Sweeney, a waitress. He was fascinated with flight from a very young age and began building balloons and gliders in his backyard as a teenager.

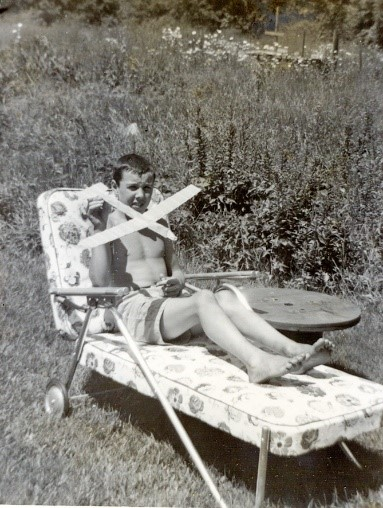
Sweeney as a pre-teen with a favorite model glider in the late 1950s.

Sweeney preparing his homemade solar balloon for flight in his Dunbarton, NH backyard in the late 1960s.

Sweeney with a friend and a Rogallo hang glider in his Dunbarton backyard in the mid-1970s

== Sweeney's Glider ==
Sweeney and one of his first gliders, a homemade $40 biplane, were featured in Fritz Wetherbee's 1971 classic hang gliding video, Sweeney's Glider. In the video, Terry Sweeney describes the inspiration for his biplane, and Wetherbee documents the efforts to get the glider off the ground. The video is accompanied throughout by music from Sweeney's band, Sweeney's Glider, singing about the dream of gliding flight.

== Sky Sports ==
Sweeney designed hang gliders for Sky Sports, an East Coast hang glider manufacturer in the mid-1970s. While working for Sky Sports, along with other members of the Sky Sports design team, including designer Tom Peghiny and pilot Dennis Pagen, Sweeney contributed to the design of the Sirocco I, Sirocco II, Osprey, Merlin, and Kestrel. Sweeney was one of the first to incorporate double sail surfaces and an enclosed crossbar in his glider designs. To improve pitch stability of these early Rogallo designs Sweeney added a strut under the sail of each wingtip, which were then attached to the top of the kingpost with a cable. Together with David Aguilar he also helped design and develop the Sky Sports supine harness. Sweeney was also an early pioneer in powered hang gliders. In 1977, he developed a twintube kingpost mount for attaching an engine to a Rogallo-type flex-wing glider; this proved to be quite a dangerous design in turbulent conditions.

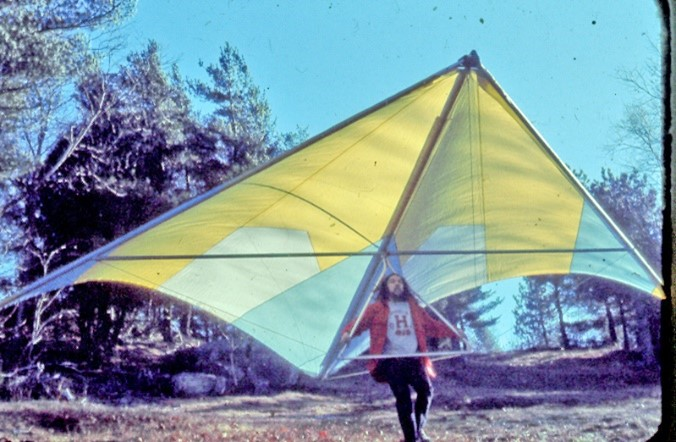
Sweeney preparing for take-off with a standard Rogallo glider in New Hampshire in the early 1970s

== Hang gliding instructor ==
After teaching himself to fly various types of fixed-wing gliders in the late 1960s, by the early 1970s, Sweeney was sharing his enthusiasm for the sport by teaching others. His beginner lessons in the "Clay Pit", an open field by a slope near his house in Dunbarton, New Hampshire, were well known throughout the East Coast by hang gliding aficionados. The hill has become overgrown with trees and is now part of a popular motocross trail called Hang Glider Hill in the Hopkinton-Everett Multi-Use Trail System in Weare, New Hampshire.

Sweeney instructs a first-time hang gliding student on the slopes of the Clay Pit, Weare, New Hampshire, in 1975.

== Awards and honors ==
- 1975 Champion, USHGA Eastern Regionals, Grandfather Mountain, North Carolina
- 1975 6th place in First World Hang Gliding Championship in Kössen, Austria
- 2003 Rogallo Hall of Fame Inductee

== Personal life ==
Terry Sweeney is married to Lisa Lapin. He is the great-nephew of the boxer Patsy Sweeney, the Manchester Whirlwind.
