= Austin Rice =

American boxer (1872–1921)

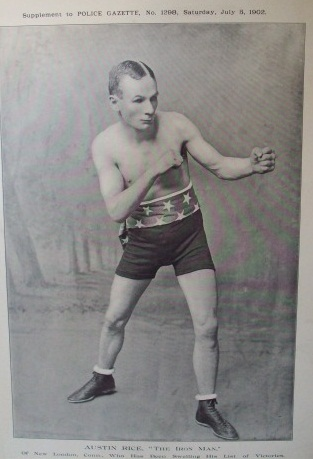
- Rice in 1902

Personal information
- Nickname: The Connecticut Ironman
- Nationality: American
- Born: December 25, 1872 New London, Connecticut
- Died: January 17, 1921 (aged 48) New London, Connecticut
- Height: 5 ft 5.5 in (1.66 m)
- Weight: Bantamweight; Featherweight

Boxing career
- Stance: Orthodox

Boxing record
- Total fights: 151
- Wins: 45
- Win by KO: 11
- Losses: 24
- Draws: 57
- No contests: 3

Austin Rice (December 25, 1872 – January 17, 1921) was a New London boxer who became a Featherweight Title contender on January 14, 1903, when he faced featherweight champion Young Corbett II in Hot Springs, Arkansas. Though he lost the fight, he went toe to toe with a world class competitor for eighteen rounds and would meet four more boxing champions, easily placing him among the World's top ten featherweight boxers for his era.

Though just missing a world title against Young Corbett II and George Dixon, Rice fought contenders Joe Bernstein, and Benny Yanger, as well as champions Harry Harris, Dave Sullivan, and Terry McGovern.

== Early life ==
Rice was born in Waterford, Connecticut, a suburb of New London, on December 25, 1872. He may have shared Tony Nelson as a boxing coach in his youth with fellow New London boxers Mosey King, an early New England Lightweight Champion and Abe Hollandersky, a welterweight, and 1913 Panamanian Heavyweight champion.

Rice got his start in boxing while drilling as a Waterford militiaman. He did some amateur bouts in New London while stationed there. One of his early boxing friends and sparring partners, Jim Gaffney, of New London, later became an important figure in the New London Police Department as well as a boxing manager. Another early opponent was Eddie Gallagher of New York. Martin and Joe Flaherty of New London worked as early managers for Rice.

== Boxing career and life in Connecticut ==
Rice fought Boston featherweight Dave Sullivan a total of four times, with the first bout coming on September 15, 1896, in a ten round draw in Queens, New York. They would fight a twelve round draw in November 1896 in New York at the New York Athletic Club, as well as meeting in 1902 and 1903. Sullivan would briefly hold the Featherweight Championship of the world for forty-six days from September to November 1898.

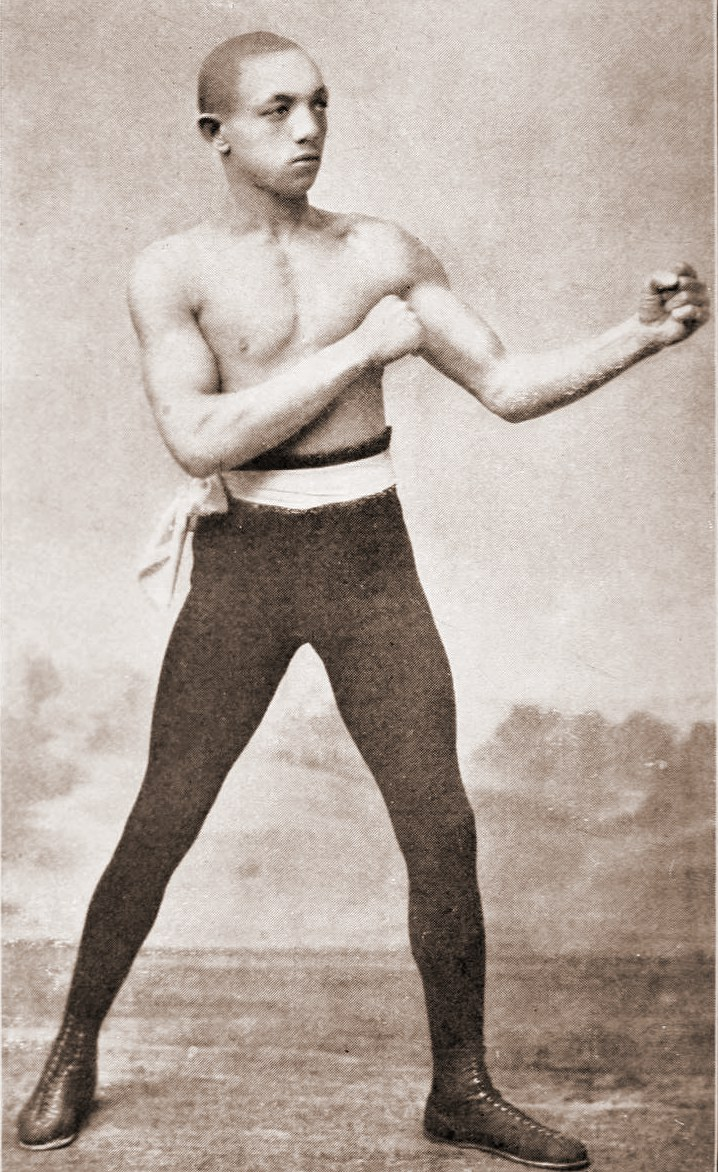
George Dixon, ex-Bantamweight, and Featherweight Champion

On December 19, 1901, Rice fought and defeated former World Bantamweight and Featherweight Champion George Dixon in a classic twenty round match at the Grand Opera House in his hometown of New London, Connecticut. Connecticut's Meriden Weekly Republican, wrote "Mr. Pollack (referee) announced Rice the victor and the crowd cheered itself hoarse although a few crawled through the ropes to sympathize with Dixon. The decision was popular and just." Dixon held the featherweight championship of the World from 1891 until losing it only a month earlier to Abe Attell on October 28, 1901. Although Canadian born, Dixon became the first Black American World champion of the twentieth century.

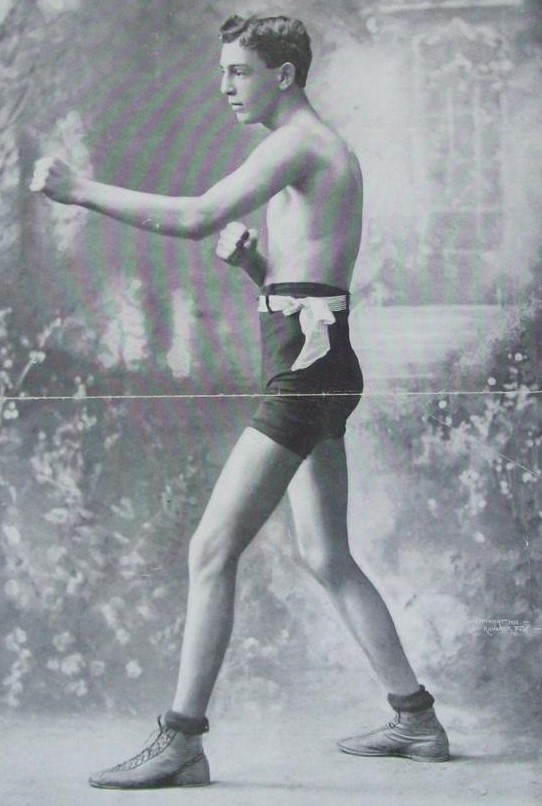
Harry Harris, ex-Bantamweight Champion 1901-2

Two months later, on February 27, 1902, Rice fought Jewish ex-Bantamweight World Champion Harry Harris to a six round draw at Chicago's Pyramid Athletic Club. That spring, Rice fought Benny Yanger, one of his most gifted opponents. Yanger, though never confirmed as a featherweight champion, beat boxing Hall of Famer Abe Attell by TKO in a close and historic nineteen round match on April 24, 1902, in St. Louis. Attell held the World Featherweight Title for an historic ten years between 1902 and 1912. Only one month after Yanger's remarkable win over featherweight champion Attell, Rice was selected to face Yanger in a six round match in Chicago on May 26, 1902, though he lost. The Topeka State Journal wrote that "George Siler gave the decision to Yanger, but not without protest from the majority of the sporting writers of the Chicago dailies." Another source noted that Rice may have won the battle with Yanger if there had been a few additional rounds.

Twice, Rice fought Billy Barrett, a competent New York featherweight in Stafford Springs and Middletown, Connecticut, on October 2 and May 1, 1901. Both bouts garnered considerable local press. They had met previously on November 26, 1899, in a close match in New York at catchweights of 128 pounds. Rice won the bout by a narrow margin.

He was well respected in New London for supporting a variety of civic causes. On June 2, 1904, Rice fought a sparring match for the benefit of the Pastime club of New London. In August 1904, Rice consented to box a three round exhibition match at the opening of the New London Opera House with fellow New London boxer and long time Yale boxing coach Mosey King.

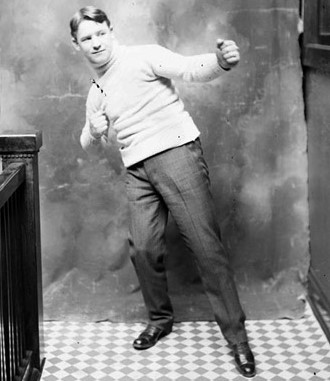
Young Corbett II, Featherweight Champion

Rice was first scheduled for a 20 round exhibition with Young Corbett II, featherweight champion, in Waterford, Connecticut, on November 6, 1902. The match did not take place until January 14, 1903, in Arkansas, and the originally scheduled bout never took place. According to one article, police officers arrested Rice in Waterbury to prevent his fighting on November 6. Corbett II was apparently arrested in Hartford as well, on the grounds that boxing was illegal in Connecticut at the time. Fellow New London boxer Mosey King made the trip with Rice to Hot Springs, Arkansas, riding the trains day and night to meet featherweight champion Young Corbett II. The Featherweight Title Bout with Young Corbett II in Arkansas on January 14, which Rice lost in a 17 round TKO, was one of the most difficult of Rice's life, and he was in considerable distress by the end of the bout, More significantly, however, the Norwich Bulletin felt Rice unexpectedly dominated the first three rounds of the historic bout, and may have performed better if not for exhaustion from the long train ride he took to get to Hot Springs. This fight became the only sanctioned chance at the World Featherweight Title Rice would receive.

Rice operated a small farm in Waterford, Connecticut, with the proceeds of his boxing wins. He was depicted by the press as a frugal person, and adept as a carpenter.

== Later boxing years and retirement ==
At the end of his more competitive years as a boxer, he fought a few exhibition bouts in New London to benefit local organizations, including the Local Fraternity of Owls in January 1911.

When not gaining income as a boxer, Rice worked at an iron mill near the end of his career. At times, he made extra income as a wrestler, as did many boxers of his era.

Rice died as a result of injuries from being run over by a wagon he was driving on January 17, 1921. He had been married and left one son, George.
