= Jimmy Barry =

American boxer

Personal information
- Nickname: The Little Tiger
- Born: James Curran Barry; March 7, 1870 Goose Island, Chicago, Illinois, U.S.
- Died: April 4, 1943 (aged 73) Chicago, Illinois, U.S.
- Height: 5 ft 2 in (1.57 m)
- Weight: Range 95 lb (43 kg); To 115 lb (52 kg); Bantamweight

Boxing career
- Stance: Orthodox

Boxing record
- Total fights: 72
- Wins: 61
- Win by KO: 39
- Draws: 10
- No contests: 1

James Curran Barry (March 7, 1870 – April 4, 1943) was an American boxer who held the world bantamweight championship from 1894 to 1899. Commonly referred to as "The Little Tiger", Barry retired undefeated with a record of 59–0–10, the most wins of any undefeated world boxing champion. He was inducted into The Ring magazine Hall of Fame in 2000.

== Career ==
He was born on Goose Island, on the North Side of Chicago, Illinois, on March 7, 1870, to Garrett and Mary Barry. He learned to box in rough schoolboy bouts, but trained for the profession in earnest by 13 when he began taking lessons at McGurn's Handball Courts in Chicago. He soon came under the tutelage of former featherweight title claimant Harry Gilmore who was impressed with his two handed power and knowledge of fundamentals. An exceptional trainer, Gilmore also had future bantamweight champion Harry Forbes as a disciple during this period. When Barry's father died in 1885, Gilmore started him on his amateur career at 15. In 1891 Barry knocked out Jack Larson, who had more experience and a weight advantage of ten pounds (4.5 kg). Not long after his win, Barry came under the management of Charles "Parson" Davies, who was hoping to mold his protege into the new bantamweight champion. Barry turned professional with Davies' assistance by 1890, and fought extensively in that year and the next, though many of his bouts were exhibitions.

=== World bantam champion, 100-102 lb. ===
In his most significant early bout, Barry knocked out the 20-year old London boxer Jack Levy in 17 rounds to win the 100-pound (45 kg) World Championship on December 5, 1893, in Roby, Indiana, though the win may not have yet been fully sanctioned by the United States. The recognized bantamweight limit at least at a later point in time, was 105 pounds (48 kg), making his win not an official bantamweight title in all record books, though it did meet the criteria for the 100-pound (45 kg) bantamweight limit used at the time.

Showing his championship form, on February 6, 1894, the blond Chicagoan faced future Irish bantamweight champion Joe McGrath at Chicago's Empire Theatre, knocking him down in less than a minute into the first round. Starting with a straight left, and a short right hook to the jaw, he put McGrath down hard in the first round. After rising unsteadily, McGrath was knocked down twice more by Barry, before time was called for the first round, with McGrath barely being able to walk to his corner. The second was tame, but near the end of the third Barry again went at McGrath, forcing him to clinch before the round ended, and a technical knockout was called when the police intervened.

Several boxing historians consider Barry's first ascent to the USA Bantamweight World championship for the 102-pound (46 kg) class to have come after his defeat of Jimmy Gorman on June 2, 1894, at the Olympic Club New Orleans, Louisiana. After five rounds, it was evident that Barry would win the contest and take the $1,000 prize on route to a convincing 11th-round knockout before a large crowd. The win was made more significant as it was sanctioned both as a United States and World championship.

=== Bantamweight 105 lb title ===
The following year, he cemented his claim to the world bantamweight crown (the weight limit at the time ranged from 100 to 112 pounds or 45 to 51 kg) when former bantamweight champion George Dixon moved up to the featherweight class. The bantamweight division in America at the time was sometimes referred to as "paperweight" and was not officially established. Barry's best-known fight became his 28th-round knockout of Sicilian boxer Casper Leon before a seasoned crowd of 250 on September 15, 1894, in Lemont, Illinois, for total stakes of $4,000. Leon would become Barry's greatest rival and his most frequent opponent. In the 20th round, Barry, though he had received punishment to his eyes in previous rounds, landed a strong blow to Leon's jaw, and the direction of the fight shifted. From the 21st through 28th rounds, Barry knocked Leon down repeatedly, until the 28th when a final blow to Leon's jaw caused the knockout. Barry, though he took home $800, was severely punished in the lengthy contest. According to one source, as the weigh-in was early, the men may have fought at several pounds above the weight limit.

Barry faced Casper Leon a second time on March 30, 1895, for both the USA and World 105 lb championship, and retained the title with a 14-round draw. The Chicago Tribune wrote that Barry was leading the match, when in the 14th round, after connecting with a series of blows, he landed a left which put Leon on the mat, causing four police officers to end the fight before Leon could be counted out or knocked down again.

Barry defeated Jimmy Anthony, a onetime holder of the Australian welterweight championship, on April 23, 1897, winning a 20-round bout in San Francisco. Barry clearly dominated the 12th through 17th rounds. In the 19th, Barry landed strong counters to the jaw of Anthony, who had received a series of punishing blows to his eyes in several rounds of the fight. Barry dominated the 20th, repeatedly striking Anthony's eyes and jaw, and when the round ended the referee gave the decision to Barry on points. Barry took home $1,500 of the $2,000 purse. The fighters fought at 115 pounds (52 kg), and though a few contemporary sources consider the fight for the bantamweight title, their weights exceeded the weight limit at the time. Barry countered Anthony's blows frequently with a straight left to the eye, and generally landed nearly twice as many blows when mixing in close quarters, dominating the infighting.

=== Bantamweight 110 lb title ===
On December 6, 1897, Barry scored a 20th-round knockout with a crushing right to the jaw against English champion Walter Croot in London, giving him claim to the vacant 110-pound (50 kg) World championship. Barry had taken a lead in the scoring through the 20th round, but Croot had nearly evened the contest by the 19th when Barry landed a series of blows, taking the fight to Croot, continuing until the 20th, when he scored the knockout with a left to the head and a right to the jaw. Several accounts maintain that Barry was told in the late rounds he would not win the title without a knockout. Croot never regained consciousness and died the following day from a brain injury. Charged with manslaughter, Barry was exonerated when it was determined that Croot had died from a fractured skull sustained when his head hit the unpadded floor, made of wood. The unfortunate incident led to reform in the creation of padded canvas ring surfaces.

Barry was distraught over Croot's death. The Chicagoan temporarily considered retirement, but though he returned to boxing when he arrived in the United States, he did not fight with the same ferocity. Barry fought ten times after the Croot tragedy and failed to score a single knockout. On May 30, 1898, Barry fought a 20-round draw against Casper Leon in New York, retaining the World 100-pound (45 kg) Bantamweight championship. Leon fought well, but lacked the force to knock out Barry, who remained calm and cautious throughout, but also lacked a knockout punch.

Barry defeated Johnny Ritchie, a well-known bantam, in Chicago on March 26, 1898, in a six-round bout. New York's The Sun, however, wrote that the match was close and could have been called a draw, describing Barry's performance as "disappointing". Many in the crowd felt the bout should have been called a draw, but some ringside believed Barry may have had the better of the fifth and sixth rounds.

Steve Flanagan met Barry on June 3, 1898, in a close bout that resulted in a six-round draw in Philadelphia. Flanagan had claimed the 105-pound (48 kg) championship a few months before the fight. The Scranton's Tribune wrote that Flanagan may have had the better of the bout, clearly dominating the third, and landing the last solid blow in the sixth on Barry's eye. The Pittsburgh Press also wrote that Flanagan had outpointed Barry. The newspaper noted that Barry had forced the pace, and fought viciously, but that Flanagan had countered well and done damage at the close of the sixth.

=== Last 110 lb title match ===
Barry faced Casper Leon again for the American and World 110-pound (50 kg) bantamweight championship in the late evening of December 29, 1898, and retained the title in a 20-round draw. In a close bout, Leon may have thrown a few more blows and shown scientific skills in his defense, but Barry's blows landed with greater precision and were more telling. The early rounds showed the most intense fighting, and though Barry caught Leon particularly hard in the sixth with a left in the face and a hard blow to the head in the seventh, the fighting was close in most respects. Barry had already considered retirement and had announced it to a few in the press, though he would take another fight the following year.

In his final bout, he boxed a six-round draw with future bantamweight champion Harry Harris on September 1, 1899. Ringside observers believed that Harris had won, but that the referee called a draw to allow Barry to retire undefeated. Chicago's Inter-Ocean wrote that Harris "clearly outpointed Barry and during the last few rounds forced the fighting after a fashion that should have gained him the decision". The Chicago Tribune wrote that Barry was fortunate to receive a draw as Harris showed considerable skill in avoiding his blows. Through 1901, Barry fought the occasional exhibition in Chicago, and continued to fight the occasional bout through at least 1910.

== Life after boxing ==
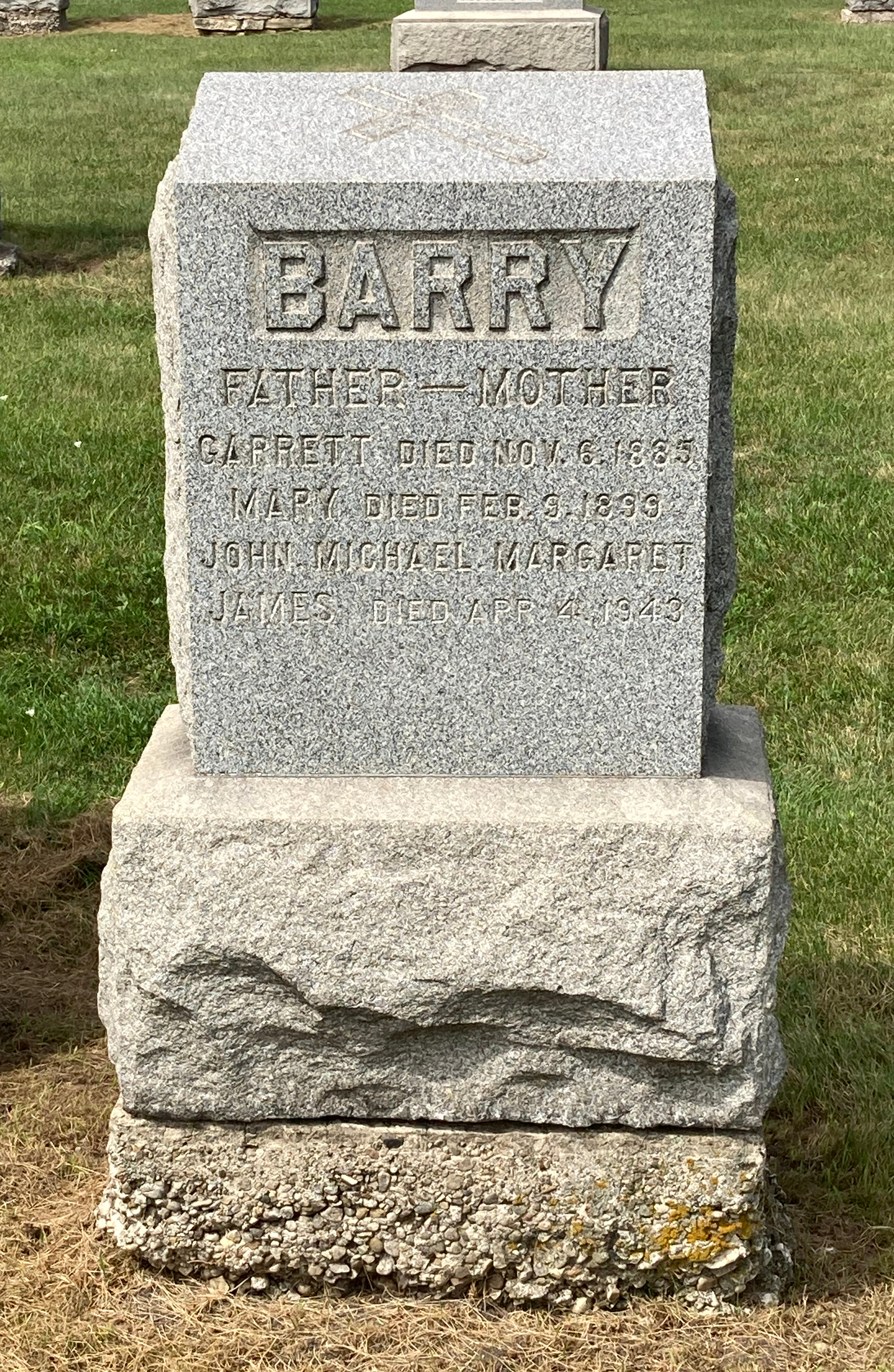
Barry's grave at Calvary Cemetery

According to Catholic Church records, Barry married Amanda Martha Claussen in Chicago on November 26, 1902.

During World War I, in 1917, Barry worked as a boxing instructor at Camp Gordon, northeast of Atlanta, Georgia. His duties included physical and bayonet training. World War I Army boxing training was led by several exceptional featherweight and lightweight champions including Benny Leonard, Packey McFarland and Johnny Kilbane. Unable to continue as an instructor due to physical limitations, he left the Army in October 1918.

After his war service, Barry worked in Chicago's Cook County clerk's office for 25 years until he left due to poor health. He occasionally refereed bouts at local clubs, likely for extra income. He died in a Chicago sanitarium on April 5, 1943, after an illness lasting four years, that according to one source may have been tuberculosis. After services at Immaculate Conception Church, he was buried in Calvary Cemetery, a Catholic cemetery in the Chicago suburb of Evanston.

According to the International Boxing Hall of Fame, which inducted the diminutive pugilist in the Old Timer category in 2000, Barry was undefeated in 70 professional fights. He won 59 bouts, 39 by knockout, and had nine draws and two no-contests. He is one of just 15 world boxing champions to retire without a loss.

== Professional boxing record ==
All information in this section is derived from BoxRec, unless otherwise stated.

=== Official Record ===
72 fights	59 wins	0 losses
By knockout	39	0
By decision	20	0
Draws	10	
No contests	1	
Newspaper decisions/draws	2	

All newspaper decisions are officially regarded as “no decision” bouts and are not counted in the win/loss/draw column.

No.	Result	Record	Opponent	Type	Round, time	Date	Location	Notes
72	Draw	59–0–10 (3)	Harry Harris	PTS	6	Sep 1, 1899	Star Theatre, Chicago, Illinois, U.S.	
71	Draw	59–0–9 (3)	Casper Leon	PTS	20	Dec 29, 1898	Claus Groth Hall, Davenport, Iowa, U.S.	Retained world bantamweight title
70	Draw	59–0–8 (3)	Casper Leon	PTS	6	Nov 21, 1898	McGurn's Handball Court, Chicago, Illinois, U.S.	Pre-arranged draw if lasting the distance
69	Draw	59–0–7 (3)	Frank Bartley	PTS	4	Oct 31, 1898	McGurn's Handball Court, Chicago, Illinois, U.S.	
68	Draw	59–0–6 (3)	Jack Ritchie	PTS	6	Aug 14, 1898	McGurn's Handball Court, Chicago, Illinois, U.S.	
67	Draw	59–0–5 (3)	Steve Flanagan	PTS	6	Jun 3, 1898	Arena A.C., Philadelphia, Pennsylvania, U.S.	
66	Draw	59–0–4 (3)	Casper Leon	PTS	20	May 30, 1898	Lenox A.C., New York City, New York, U.S.	Retained world bantamweight title
65	Draw	59–0–3 (3)	Billy Rotchford	PTS	6	Apr 18, 1898	Tattersall's, Chicago, Illinois, U.S.	
64	Win	59–0–2 (3)	Johnny Ritchie	PTS	6	Mar 26, 1898	Chicago A.A., Chicago, Illinois, U.S.	
63	Win	58–0–2 (3)	Johnny Connors	PTS	6	Mar 17, 1898	Tattersall's, Chicago, Illinois, U.S.	
62	Win	57–0–2 (3)	Walter Croot	KO	20 (20), 2:25	Dec 6, 1897	National Sporting Club, Covent Garden, London, England	Won vacant world paperweight title; Croot died of injuries sustained from the fight.
61	Win	56–0–2 (3)	Jimmy Anthony	PTS	20	Apr 23, 1897	Woodward's Pavilion, San Francisco, California, U.S.	Retained world bantamweight title
60	Win	55–0–2 (3)	Jack Ward	PTS	20	Mar 1, 1897	American A.C., New York City, New York, U.S.	Retained world bantamweight title
59	Draw	54–0–2 (3)	Sammy Kelly	PTS	20	Jan 30, 1897	Broadway A.C., New York City, New York, U.S.	
58	Win	54–0–1 (3)	Jack Berger	KO	1 (?)	Jan 18, 1897	Chicago, Illinois, U.S.	
57	Win	53–0–1 (3)	Harry Dally	KO	2 (?)	Jan 10, 1897	Chicago, Illinois, U.S.	
56	Win	52–0–1 (3)	Steve Flanagan	PTS	6	Aug 10, 1896	Caledonian A.C., Philadelphia, Pennsylvania, U.S.	
55	Win	51–0–1 (3)	Joe O'Donnell	KO	3 (?)	Mar 20, 1896	Chicago, Illinois, U.S.	
54	Win	50–0–1 (3)	Jim McGuire	KO	2 (?)	Mar 15, 1896	Chicago, Illinois, U.S.	
53	Win	49–0–1 (3)	Young Spitz	KO	8 (?)	Feb 18, 1896	Chicago, Illinois, U.S.	
52	Win	48–0–1 (3)	Young Lyons	KO	1 (?)	Jan 12, 1896	Chicago, Illinois, U.S.	
51	Win	47–0–1 (3)	Jack Madden	TKO	4 (20)	Oct 21, 1895	Empire A.C., Maspeth, New York City, New York, U.S.	Retained world bantamweight title
50	Win	46–0–1 (3)	Jack Lynch	NWS	4	Sep 30, 1895	Southwark A.C., Philadelphia, Pennsylvania, U.S.	
49	ND	46–0–1 (2)	Casper Leon	ND	4	Aug 19, 1895	Academy of Music, New York City, New York, U.S.	No decision was given
48	Win	46–0–1 (1)	Dave Ross	KO	2 (15)	Jul 15, 1895	Union Park Hall, Boston, Massachusetts, U.S.	Won vacant American bantamweight title
47	Draw	45–0–1 (1)	Casper Leon	PTS	14 (15)	Mar 30, 1895	2nd Regiment Armory, Chicago, Illinois, U.S.	Retained world bantamweight title; The police intervened and saved Leon
46	Win	45–0 (1)	Joe Bertrand	TKO	6 (6)	Mar 21, 1895	Tattersall's, Chicago, Illinois, U.S.	
45	Win	44–0 (1)	George Church	PTS	8	Nov 14, 1894	Chicago, Illinois, U.S.	
44	Win	43–0 (1)	Casper Leon	KO	28 (?)	Sep 15, 1894	Picnic Grove, Lamont, Illinois, U.S.	Retained world 110lbs title; Won vacant American 110lbs title; Finish fight
43	Win	42–0 (1)	Harry Brooks	PTS	4	Jul 3, 1894	Bradford Falls, Pennsylvania, U.S.	
42	Win	41–0 (1)	Jimmy Gorman	KO	10	Jun 2, 1894	Olympic Club, New Orleans, Louisiana, U.S.	Billed world 102lbs title; Finish fight
41	Win	40–0 (1)	Bob Costello	TKO	2 (4)	Feb 28, 1894	Lakefront Armory, Chicago, Illinois, U.S.	Police intervened
40	Win	39–0 (1)	Joe McGrath	KO	3 (?)	Feb 6, 1894	Empire Theater, Chicago, Illinois, U.S.	
39	Win	38–0 (1)	Young Cransden	KO	3 (8)	Jan 22, 1894	McGurn's Handball Court, Chicago, Illinois, U.S.	
38	Win	37–0 (1)	Jack Levy	KO	17 (20)	Dec 5, 1893	Roby, Indiana, U.S.	Billed world 100lbs title
37	Win	36–0 (1)	Jack Fitzgerald	NWS	4	Nov 13, 1893	Tattersall's, Chicago, Illinois, U.S.	
36	Win	36–0	Tom Cassidy	KO	6 (?)	Sep 9, 1893	Chicago, Illinois, U.S.	
35	Win	35–0	Con Sheehan	PTS	5	Aug 7, 1893	Chicago, Illinois, U.S.	
34	Win	34–0	Jimmy Shea	TKO	4 (10)	Jul 10, 1893	Columbian Athletic Club, Roby, Indiana, U.S.	
33	Win	33–0	Lou Simmons	PTS	6	Apr 5, 1893	Chicago, Illinois, U.S.	
32	Win	32–0	Jockey Stanton	KO	2 (?)	Mar 20, 1893	Chicago, Illinois, U.S.	
31	Win	31–0	Billy Murphy	KO	1 (?)	Feb 12, 1893	Chicago, Illinois, U.S.	
30	Win	30–0	Dave Ross	KO	2 (?)	Jan 20, 1893	Chicago, Illinois, U.S.	
29	Win	29–0	Bobby Quaid	KO	10	Jan 14, 1893	Chicago, Illinois, U.S.	Won vacant 105-lb Championship of the West; A finish fight
28	Win	28–0	Max Saufeldt	KO	1 (?)	Jan 8, 1893	Chicago, Illinois, U.S.	
27	Win	27–0	Joe Gates	PTS	6	Oct 11, 1892	Chicago, Illinois, U.S.	
26	Win	26–0	Frank Murphy	KO	7 (?)	Sep 3, 1892	Springfield, Illinois, U.S.	
25	Win	25–0	Young Moron	KO	2 (?)	Aug 8, 1892	Chicago, Illinois, U.S.	
24	Win	24–0	Dick Reddy	KO	4 (?)	Jul 4, 1892	Chicago, Illinois, U.S.	
23	Win	23–0	Romeo Durand	PTS	4	Jun 8, 1892	Chicago, Illinois, U.S.	
22	Win	22–0	Kid Corbett	PTS	4	May 10, 1892	Chicago, Illinois, U.S.	
21	Win	21–0	Jack Smith	PTS	5	Apr 3, 1892	Chicago, Illinois, U.S.	
20	Win	20–0	Paddy Snow	KO	2 (?)	Mar 12, 1892	Chicago, Illinois, U.S.	
19	Win	19–0	Billy Joyce	KO	3 (?)	Mar 2, 1892	Chicago, Illinois, U.S.	
18	Win	18–0	Dan Dummy Rowan	KO	4 (?)	Feb 20, 1892	Chicago, Illinois, U.S.	
17	Win	17–0	Billy Wellington	PTS	6	Feb 1, 1892	Chicago, Illinois, U.S.	
16	Win	16–0	Barney McCall	PTS	4	Oct 1, 1891	United States of America	Exact date and location unknown
15	Win	15–0	Tom Cassidy	PTS	6	Sep 1, 1891	United States of America	Exact date and location unknown
14	Win	14–0	Jack Miller	PTS	4	Aug 10, 1891	United States of America	Exact date and location unknown
13	Win	13–0	Shorty Cleveland	PTS	3	Aug 6, 1891	Ducat's Hall, Evanston, Illinois, U.S.	
12	Win	12–0	Al Newman	KO	1 (?)	Aug 1, 1891	United States of America	Exact date and location unknown
11	Win	11–0	Young Lyons	KO	1 (?)	Jul 30, 1891	United States of America	Exact date and location unknown
10	Win	10–0	Jack Kelly	KO	1 (?)	Jul 20, 1891	United States of America	Exact date and location unknown
9	Win	9–0	Jack Ghetlain	KO	1 (?)	Jul 10, 1891	United States of America	Exact date and location unknown
8	Win	8–0	Joe Gates	KO	2 (6)	Jun 24, 1891	McGurn's Handball Court, Chicago, Illinois, U.S.	
7	Win	7–0	Jockey Sloane	KO	3 (?)	Jun 1, 1891	United States of America	Exact date and location unknown
6	Win	6–0	Joe O'Leary	KO	3 (?)	May 1, 1891	United States of America	Exact date and location unknown
5	Win	5–0	Tom Cassidy	KO	2 (?)	Apr 20, 1891	Battery D Armory, Chicago, Illinois, U.S.	
4	Win	4–0	Dick Ward	KO	3 (?)	Feb 1, 1891	United States of America	Exact date and location unknown
3	Win	3–0	Fred Larson	KO	1 (4)	Jan 1, 1891	United States of America	Exact date and location unknown
2	Win	2–0	Al Shrosbree	PTS	4	Apr 28, 1890	Casino Gymnasium, Chicago, Illinois, U.S.	
1	Win	1–0	Spud Murphy	PTS	4	Jan 27, 1890	Chicago, Illinois, U.S.	Professional debut Exact date and location are unknown

=== Unofficial record ===
72 fights	61 wins	0 losses
By knockout	39	0
By decision	22	0
Draws	10	
No contests	1	

Record with the inclusion of newspaper decisions in the win/loss/draw column.

No.	Result	Record	Opponent	Type	Round, time	Date	Location	Notes
72	Draw	61–0–10 (1)	Harry Harris	PTS	6	Sep 1, 1899	Star Theatre, Chicago, Illinois, U.S.	
71	Draw	61–0–9 (1)	Casper Leon	PTS	20	Dec 29, 1898	Claus Groth Hall, Davenport, Iowa, U.S.	Retained world bantamweight title
70	Draw	61–0–8 (1)	Casper Leon	PTS	6	Nov 21, 1898	McGurn's Handball Court, Chicago, Illinois, U.S.	Pre-arranged draw if lasting the distance
69	Draw	61–0–7 (1)	Frank Bartley	PTS	4	Oct 31, 1898	McGurn's Handball Court, Chicago, Illinois, U.S.	
68	Draw	61–0–6 (1)	Jack Ritchie	PTS	6	Aug 14, 1898	McGurn's Handball Court, Chicago, Illinois, U.S.	
67	Draw	61–0–5 (1)	Steve Flanagan	PTS	6	Jun 3, 1898	Arena A.C., Philadelphia, Pennsylvania, U.S.	
66	Draw	61–0–4 (1)	Casper Leon	PTS	20	May 30, 1898	Lenox A.C., New York City, New York, U.S.	Retained world bantamweight title
65	Draw	61–0–3 (1)	Billy Rotchford	PTS	6	Apr 18, 1898	Tattersall's, Chicago, Illinois, U.S.	
64	Win	61–0–2 (1)	Johnny Ritchie	PTS	6	Mar 26, 1898	Chicago A.A., Chicago, Illinois, U.S.	
63	Win	60–0–2 (1)	Johnny Connors	PTS	6	Mar 17, 1898	Tattersall's, Chicago, Illinois, U.S.	
62	Win	59–0–2 (1)	Walter Croot	KO	20 (20), 2:25	Dec 6, 1897	National Sporting Club, Covent Garden, London, England	Won vacant world paperweight title; Croot died of injuries sustained from the fight.
61	Win	58–0–2 (1)	Jimmy Anthony	PTS	20	Apr 23, 1897	Woodward's Pavilion, San Francisco, California, U.S.	Retained world bantamweight title
60	Win	57–0–2 (1)	Jack Ward	PTS	20	Mar 1, 1897	American A.C., New York City, New York, U.S.	Retained world bantamweight title
59	Draw	56–0–2 (1)	Sammy Kelly	PTS	20	Jan 30, 1897	Broadway A.C., New York City, New York, U.S.	
58	Win	56–0–1 {(1)	Jack Berger	KO	1 (?)	Jan 18, 1897	Chicago, Illinois, U.S.	
57	Win	55–0–1 (1)	Harry Dally	KO	2 (?)	Jan 10, 1897	Chicago, Illinois, U.S.	
56	Win	54–0–1 (1)	Steve Flanagan	PTS	6	Aug 10, 1896	Caledonian A.C., Philadelphia, Pennsylvania, U.S.	
55	Win	53–0–1 (1)	Joe O'Donnell	KO	3 (?)	Mar 20, 1896	Chicago, Illinois, U.S.	
54	Win	52–0–1 (1)	Jim McGuire	KO	2 (?)	Mar 15, 1896	Chicago, Illinois, U.S.	
53	Win	51–0–1 (1)	Young Spitz	KO	8 (?)	Feb 18, 1896	Chicago, Illinois, U.S.	
52	Win	50–0–1 (1)	Young Lyons	KO	1 (?)	Jan 12, 1896	Chicago, Illinois, U.S.	
51	Win	49–0–1 (1)	Jack Madden	TKO	4 (20)	Oct 21, 1895	Empire A.C., Maspeth, New York City, New York, U.S.	Retained world bantamweight title
50	Win	48–0–1 (1)	Jack Lynch	NWS	4	Sep 30, 1895	Southwark A.C., Philadelphia, Pennsylvania, U.S.	
49	ND	47–0–1 (1)	Casper Leon	ND	4	Aug 19, 1895	Academy of Music, New York City, New York, U.S.	No decision was given
48	Win	47–0–1	Dave Ross	KO	2 (15)	Jul 15, 1895	Union Park Hall, Boston, Massachusetts, U.S.	Won vacant American bantamweight title
47	Draw	46–0–1	Casper Leon	PTS	14 (15)	Mar 30, 1895	2nd Regiment Armory, Chicago, Illinois, U.S.	Retained world bantamweight title; The police intervened and saved Leon
46	Win	46–0	Joe Bertrand	TKO	6 (6)	Mar 21, 1895	Tattersall's, Chicago, Illinois, U.S.	
45	Win	45–0	George Church	PTS	8	Nov 14, 1894	Chicago, Illinois, U.S.	
44	Win	44–0	Casper Leon	KO	28 (?)	Sep 15, 1894	Picnic Grove, Lamont, Illinois, U.S.	Retained world 110lbs title; Won vacant American 110lbs title; Finish fight
43	Win	43–0	Harry Brooks	PTS	4	Jul 3, 1894	Bradford Falls, Pennsylvania, U.S.	
42	Win	42–0	Jimmy Gorman	KO	10	Jun 2, 1894	Olympic Club, New Orleans, Louisiana, U.S.	Billed world 102lbs title; Finish fight
41	Win	41–0	Bob Costello	TKO	2 (4)	Feb 28, 1894	Lakefront Armory, Chicago, Illinois, U.S.	Police intervened
40	Win	40–0	Joe McGrath	KO	3 (?)	Feb 6, 1894	Empire Theater, Chicago, Illinois, U.S.	
39	Win	39–0	Young Cransden	KO	3 (8)	Jan 22, 1894	McGurn's Handball Court, Chicago, Illinois, U.S.	
38	Win	38–0	Jack Levy	KO	17 (20)	Dec 5, 1893	Roby, Indiana, U.S.	Billed world 100lbs title
37	Win	37–0	Jack Fitzgerald	NWS	4	Nov 13, 1893	Tattersall's, Chicago, Illinois, U.S.	
36	Win	36–0	Tom Cassidy	KO	6 (?)	Sep 9, 1893	Chicago, Illinois, U.S.	
35	Win	35–0	Con Sheehan	PTS	5	Aug 7, 1893	Chicago, Illinois, U.S.	
34	Win	34–0	Jimmy Shea	TKO	4 (10)	Jul 10, 1893	Columbian Athletic Club, Roby, Indiana, U.S.	
33	Win	33–0	Lou Simmons	PTS	6	Apr 5, 1893	Chicago, Illinois, U.S.	
32	Win	32–0	Jockey Stanton	KO	2 (?)	Mar 20, 1893	Chicago, Illinois, U.S.	
31	Win	31–0	Billy Murphy	KO	1 (?)	Feb 12, 1893	Chicago, Illinois, U.S.	
30	Win	30–0	Dave Ross	KO	2 (?)	Jan 20, 1893	Chicago, Illinois, U.S.	
29	Win	29–0	Bobby Quaid	KO	10	Jan 14, 1893	Chicago, Illinois, U.S.	Won vacant 105-lb Championship of the West; A finish fight
28	Win	28–0	Max Saufeldt	KO	1 (?)	Jan 8, 1893	Chicago, Illinois, U.S.	
27	Win	27–0	Joe Gates	PTS	6	Oct 11, 1892	Chicago, Illinois, U.S.	
26	Win	26–0	Frank Murphy	KO	7 (?)	Sep 3, 1892	Springfield, Illinois, U.S.	
25	Win	25–0	Young Moron	KO	2 (?)	Aug 8, 1892	Chicago, Illinois, U.S.	
24	Win	24–0	Dick Reddy	KO	4 (?)	Jul 4, 1892	Chicago, Illinois, U.S.	
23	Win	23–0	Romeo Durand	PTS	4	Jun 8, 1892	Chicago, Illinois, U.S.	
22	Win	22–0	Kid Corbett	PTS	4	May 10, 1892	Chicago, Illinois, U.S.	
21	Win	21–0	Jack Smith	PTS	5	Apr 3, 1892	Chicago, Illinois, U.S.	
20	Win	20–0	Paddy Snow	KO	2 (?)	Mar 12, 1892	Chicago, Illinois, U.S.	
19	Win	19–0	Billy Joyce	KO	3 (?)	Mar 2, 1892	Chicago, Illinois, U.S.	
18	Win	18–0	Dan Dummy Rowan	KO	4 (?)	Feb 20, 1892	Chicago, Illinois, U.S.	
17	Win	17–0	Billy Wellington	PTS	6	Feb 1, 1892	Chicago, Illinois, U.S.	
16	Win	16–0	Barney McCall	PTS	4	Oct 1, 1891	United States of America	Exact date and location unknown
15	Win	15–0	Tom Cassidy	PTS	6	Sep 1, 1891	United States of America	Exact date and location unknown
14	Win	14–0	Jack Miller	PTS	4	Aug 10, 1891	United States of America	Exact date and location unknown
13	Win	13–0	Shorty Cleveland	PTS	3	Aug 6, 1891	Ducat's Hall, Evanston, Illinois, U.S.	
12	Win	12–0	Al Newman	KO	1 (?)	Aug 1, 1891	United States of America	Exact date and location unknown
11	Win	11–0	Young Lyons	KO	1 (?)	Jul 30, 1891	United States of America	Exact date and location unknown
10	Win	10–0	Jack Kelly	KO	1 (?)	Jul 20, 1891	United States of America	Exact date and location unknown
9	Win	9–0	Jack Ghetlain	KO	1 (?)	Jul 10, 1891	United States of America	Exact date and location unknown
8	Win	8–0	Joe Gates	KO	2 (6)	Jun 24, 1891	McGurn's Handball Court, Chicago, Illinois, U.S.	
7	Win	7–0	Jockey Sloane	KO	3 (?)	Jun 1, 1891	United States of America	Exact date and location unknown
6	Win	6–0	Joe O'Leary	KO	3 (?)	May 1, 1891	United States of America	Exact date and location unknown
5	Win	5–0	Tom Cassidy	KO	2 (?)	Apr 20, 1891	Battery D Armory, Chicago, Illinois, U.S.	
4	Win	4–0	Dick Ward	KO	3 (?)	Feb 1, 1891	United States of America	Exact date and location unknown
3	Win	3–0	Fred Larson	KO	1 (4)	Jan 1, 1891	United States of America	Exact date and location unknown
2	Win	2–0	Al Shrosbree	PTS	4	Apr 28, 1890	Casino Gymnasium, Chicago, Illinois, U.S.	
1	Win	1–0	Spud Murphy	PTS	4	Jan 27, 1890	Chicago, Illinois, U.S.	Professional debut Exact date and location are unknown

== See also ==
- Lineal championship

Achievements
Vacant Title last held by George Dixon	World Bantamweight Champion; December 5, 1894 – 1897; Vacated	Vacant Title next held by Terry McGovern
Vacant Title last held by Casper Leon	World Bantamweight Champion; May 30, 1898 – September 1, 1899; Retired	Vacant Title next held by Harry Harris
Sporting positions
Preceded by Torpedo Billy Murphy	Oldest living world champion July 26, 1939 – April 4, 1943	Succeeded by Tommy Ryan
