= Mosey King =

American boxer (1884–1956)

Personal information
- Nationality: American
- Born: Moses King; January 1, 1884 New York City
- Died: December 10, 1956 (aged 72) New Haven, Connecticut
- Weight: Lightweight

Boxing career
- Stance: Orthodox

Boxing record
- Total fights: 38
- Wins: 12
- Win by KO: 6
- Losses: 13
- Draws: 12
- No contests: 3

Mosey King (January 1, 1884 – December 10, 1956) was a New England lightweight boxing champion who became an assistant boxing coach at Yale in 1906 under Bill Dole and subsequently served as head coach for forty-six years. King was also Connecticut's first boxing commissioner, serving from 1921 to 1923. At Yale, he was a popular figure, and worked to familiarize members of the football team with boxing to improve their conditioning.

== Early life ==
King began boxing as early as fourteen. One of eight children with mostly biblical names, he was born in New York on January 1, 1884, to Jewish parents, but moved to New London, Connecticut at the age of five. He may have shared Tony Nelson as a boxing coach in his youth with fellow New London boxers Austin Rice, a contender for the World Featherweight Title, and Abe Hollandersky, a welterweight, and Panamanian Heavyweight champion. Nelson was at one time a cornerman for the undefeated Lightweight World Champion Jack McAuliffe.

== Boxing career and lightweight championship of New England ==
Patsey Sweeney, Lightweight

One of King's earliest bouts, around the age of sixteen, was with Patsy Sweeney at the New London Opera House on January 11, 1899. Though King lost the six round bout by TKO, Sweeny was a talented boxer who would meet 1906 welterweight champion William "Honey" Mellody three times from 1903–4.

On May 1, 1902, at only eighteen, King won a fight billed as the Lightweight Championship of New England by defeating Shorty Gans in New Britain by knockout in sixteen rounds. Dick Howell, a reporter for Bridgeport's Sunday Herald was the referee. King's manager was Jack Gaffney, originally of New London, and one of King's early training partners. The Herald reporter noted that King's "ducking, blocking, timing, and ability to judge distance were of the first order."

On November 20, 1902, King fought Martin Canole in Fall River, Massachusetts to a six-round draw. Holding his own with a boxer of this caliber showed great promise for the determined eighteen-year-old. Canole was considered to have competed for Lightweight championships by the time of his fight with King.

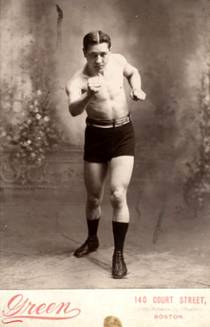
William "Honey" Mellody, 1906 Welterweight Champion

King fought Willie Lewis, a future World Welterweight contender, losing in two twenty round bouts in 1902 in New Brittain, and New London, Connecticut. He met William "Honey" Melody, 1906 Welterweight Champion, on March 31, 1903 in Boston, losing by a points decision in eight rounds. On March 26, 1904 in Chicago, he lost in six rounds to Kid Goodman, an exceptional welterweight, who would fight champions Abe Attell, Harry Lewis, and Young Corbett II the following year.

King was more in his element fighting top regional lightweights, meeting Jeff Doherty in April 1906 and June 1907 in New Haven. King's close ten round bout with regional lightweight champion Jeff Doherty on June 21, 1907, sanctioned as a Connecticut Lightweight Title match, was a pre-arranged draw. In his short but distinguished career he fought over one hundred bouts, though only about half of those appear in his BoxRec record in the textbox above.

In February 1909, King announced he would retire from professional boxing, and devote all his time to coaching at Yale. At this point in his career, one reporter noted no boxing instructor at Yale had been so popular.

In 1921, King agreed to box Jack McAuliffe, former undefeated Lightweight World Champion 1886–93, in a benefit for Austin Rice. Rice had been a frequent New London boxing opponent and training partner before his untimely death. One of King's likely early coaches, Tony Nelson, had once been a corner man for McAuliffe.

== Career as Yale Boxing Coach ==
After one year as an assistant coach, King was made head coach of the Yale Boxing team in 1907, during an era when boxing was one of the most popular American spectator sports. King, who stayed slim and in physical condition throughout his life, boxed on a regular basis in short friendly matches with the boxers, wrestlers, and football players he coached.

During the winter of 1917, head Yale football coach Tad Jones made boxing training required for all candidates of the Yale football team. Jones, and many coaches of the period considered boxing training an excellent method to achieve physical conditioning and strength. Many members of the Harvard Football team were also active with the college's boxing team.

Prior to the creation and growth of professional sports, Ivy League athletic teams had some of the widest publicity and interest of all the team sports in America. In November 1920, the Evening times-Republican noted that the Yale boxing team anticipated the best season in their history, and that "nearly 200 candidates had expressed an interest in donning the chamois mittens." The reporter observed that King's boxing training was "unique" and was "especially interesting for college students."

A year later in December 1921, the Norwich Bulletin, in a tribute to King's popularity at Yale, wrote that "When he assumed charge of the Yale boxing class, "Mosey" had only twenty-five youngsters confronting him eager to learn the inside stuff of the Marquis of Queensbury sport. Yesterday, when his seventh call was answered, three hundred pupils put their names down as candidates for the Yale boxing team."

Upon assuming his duties with the Connecticut boxing commission in the fall of 1921, King was quoted as saying "There'll be no phony stuff as far as boxing is concerned in Connecticut. We mean business and the New York Promoters who have been using Connecticut as a place to exploit a lot of bouts not above board can take notice."

King was often depicted as a vibrant man concerned about the lives of youths. In 1927, he rescued a twenty-year-old Yale student whose rubber raft had floated far out into Long Island sound.

== Later life ==
King retired from Yale around 1953 but remained in New Haven and continued to help students in need. He stayed on as coach a few years after Yale had abandoned boxing as an intercollegiate sport. In January 1956, while taking one of his regular constitutional walks in New Haven, he was struck by a car while crossing Whalley Avenue, a busy intersection. He died from the resulting injuries. King left no children and was survived by three brothers and a sister. Through shrewd investment and frugal living, he left a considerable fortune at the time of his death. Some speculate he was aided in his investment strategy by the guidance of many of the accomplished Yale alumni who were his close friends. In February 1957, a Mosey King Memorial plaque was presented to Yale Dean Clarence Wendell at a reunion dinner of the Atlanta Athletic Club.
