= Edwin Harris (cricketer) =

English cricketer (1891–1961)

Personal information
- Full name: Edwin Lawson James Harris
- Born: 29 August 1891; Littlehampton, Sussex, England
- Died: 31 July 1961 (aged 69); East Preston, Sussex, England
- Batting: Right-handed
- Bowling: Right-arm medium
- Relatives: Henry Harris (father)

Domestic team information
- Years: Team
- 1922–1924: Sussex

Career statistics
Competition	First-class
Matches	9
Runs scored	208
Batting average	14.85
100s/50s	–/1
Top score	51*
Balls bowled	150
Wickets	3
Bowling average	19.66
5 wickets in innings	–
10 wickets in match	–
Best bowling	2/3
Catches/stumpings	3/–
- Source: Cricinfo, 30 June 2012

Edwin Lawson James Harris (29 August 1891 – 31 July 1961) was an English cricketer. Harris was a right-handed batsman who bowled right-arm medium pace. He was born at Littlehampton, Sussex.

Harris made his first-class debut for Sussex against Northamptonshire at the County Ground, Hove, in the 1922 County Championship. He made eight further first-class appearances for the county, the last of which came against Cambridge University in 1924. In his nine first-class matches, he scored 208 runs at an average of 14.85, with a high score of 51 not out. This score was his only half century and came against Cambridge University in 1924. With the ball, he took 3 wickets at a bowling average of 19.66, with best figures of 2/3.

He died at East Preston, Sussex, on 31 July 1961. His father, Henry, also played first-class cricket.
