= Harold Harris =

Harold Harris may refer to:

- Harold Arthur Harris (1902–1974), British classical scholar
- Harold D. Harris (1903–1984), United States Marine Corps officer
- Harold R. Harris (1895–1988), American test pilot
- Harold Harris (publisher) (1915-1993)
- Harold Harris (actor) in 1986 film That's Life! (film)
- Harold Harris, director of 1999 Christmas film The Nuttiest Nutcracker

== See also ==
- Harry Harris (disambiguation)
