= Sam Harris (disambiguation) =

Sam Harris (born 1967) is an American author, philosopher, and neuroscientist.

Sam Harris may also refer to:

- Sam H. Harris (1872–1941), American theater producer, theater owner, and manager
- Sam Hyde Harris (1889–1977), American painter
- Sam Harris (singer) (born 1961), American actor and recording artist
- Sam Harris (rugby, born 1980), New Zealand rugby footballer
- Sam Harris (basketball) (born 1984), Australian basketball player
- Sam Harris (born 1988), American singer and frontman for the rock group X Ambassadors
- Sam Harris (rugby union, born 2003), English rugby union player

== See also ==
- Samantha Harris (disambiguation)
- Samuel Harris (disambiguation)
