= Samantha Harris (disambiguation) =

Samantha Harris (born 1973) is an American TV presenter.

Samantha Harris may also refer to:

- Samantha Harris (model) (born 1990), Australian fashion model
- Samantha Harris, fictional character in the film Comedown

== See also ==
- Sam Harris (disambiguation)
