= Harry Harris (boxer) =

American boxer (1880–1959)

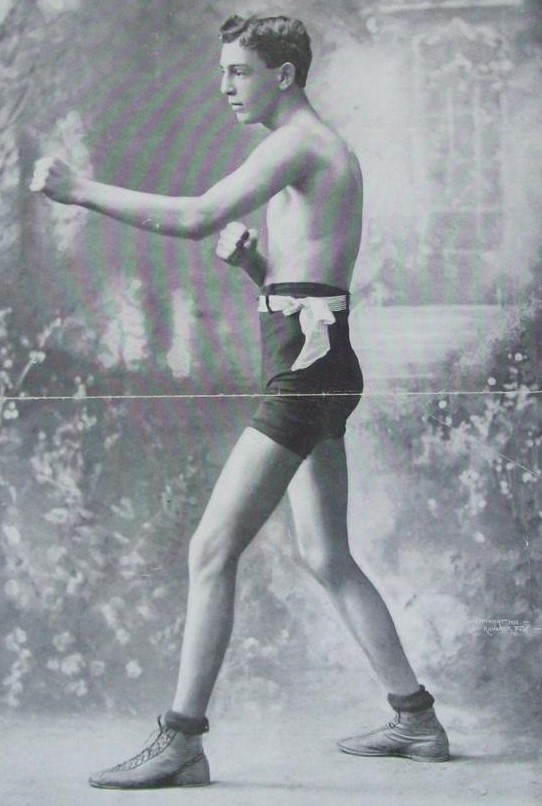

Personal information
- Nicknames: Human Scissors; Human Hairpin; Human Stringbean
- Nationality: American
- Born: Harry Harris; November 18, 1880 Chicago, Illinois
- Died: June 5, 1959 (aged 78) New York, New York
- Height: 5 ft 7.75 in (1.72 m)
- Weight: Bantamweight

Boxing career
- Reach: 68 in (173 cm)
- Stance: Orthodox

Boxing record
- Total fights: 54
- Wins: 40
- Win by KO: 14
- Losses: 2
- Draws: 8
- No contests: 4

Harry Harris ("The Human Hairpin"; November 18, 1880 – June 5, 1959) was an American boxer. He was the World Bantamweight champion from 1901 to 1902, but boxed top-rated opponents throughout his career. Charley Rose ranked Harris as the #10 All-Time Bantamweight.

== Early life and career ==
Harris was born on November 18, 1880, a few minutes apart from his twin brother, Sammy, on Chicago's South Side. Growing up in a formidable Chicago neighborhood, he began boxing as a kid, pounding the bag with his brother after school at a local gym. With an artistic bent, he began taking drawing classes in Chicago.

Beginning prize fighting in 1896 at the age of 16, he abandoned his aspirations to become a professional artist, and dropped out of high school to find time to train. In his first two years as a professional, he won sixteen of seventeen fights with one draw. In his early career, he took tips from Charles Kid McCoy, a former welterweight boxing star, and 1897 World Middleweight Champion, who helped him master his trademark "corkscrew punch", a twisting blow delivered as a hooking uppercut. During his boxing career, Harris and McCoy would go on tour together giving boxing shows.

On April 2, and April 16, 1898, Harris defeated Morris Rauch in six rounds in Chicago. Rauch was recognized as a fringe featherweight contender. In 1903 and 1904, he would meet champions Abe Attell and Harry Forbes. Rauch had met Forbes three times earlier in 1897. Harris had drawn with Rauch in December 1897, and would draw with him again in May 1900 in a six-round bout in Chicago.

On November 22, 1898, he defeated Charles Roden in a ninth-round technical knockout at the Lenox Athletic Club in New York City. The New Jersey boxer had a five-inch height disadvantage in his matchup with Harris. With a few accomplished boxers in his resume, Roden had met the great Terry McGovern in December of the previous year.

=== Win over former feather champ Billy Murphy, 1899 ===
On May 19, 1899, Harris knocked out the 1890 World Featherweight Champion, "Torpedo" Billy Murphy in the fourth round at the Star Theater in Chicago, Illinois. Murphy was an Australian born featherweight of considerable fame, and achievement.

=== Meeting fellow Jewish boxer Sig Hart ===
Harris met Chicago Jewish boxer Sig Hart twice in Iowa, on July 7, and August 4, 1899, winning in a fifteen-round points decision and a six-round knockout. In their July bout, before a crowd of around 300 at Saengerfest Hall, Harris put Hart down in the twelfth for a count of nine, and he was down again in the thirteenth. Harris used his reach to his advantage throughout the bout, landing solid blows and effectively blocking those of Hart to take the points decision. Harris appeared to have an advantage from the start, and Hart clinched frequently to avoid his blows. Hart was an accomplished boxer in his own right, another hero of the Chicago Jewish Ghetto crowd, and faced many of the same opponents as Harris including the champion Torpedo Billy Murphy.

=== Draw with champion Jimmy Barry ===
On September 1, 1899, Harris, at 112 pounds, fought a draw with the great bantamweight Jimmy Barry at the Star Theater in Chicago, Illinois. The fifth and sixth rounds were close, with Barry having the advantage in the fourth, landing some telling rights, and having a slight edge in the first two rounds as well. Barry was considered one of the world's top bantamweights, and held the World Bantamweight Championship during his years as a boxer. The Chicago Inter-Ocean noted that Harris forced the fighting in the third and fourth rounds, perhaps appearing to score more points in the eyes of some, and clearly won the second using his left on Barry repeatedly, evading Barry's counter punches. The InterOcean, gave the fourth to Harris as well, and felt he should have won the bout on points. At the end of the fourth, Barry made a drive, and appeared to take the round. Another source wrote that the draw was justified, but the bout was clearly close in many respects. Barry had come out of a retirement to fight Harris, and announced he would return to retirement after the bout.

=== Bouts with Steve Flanagan, February 1899 ===
In a notable bout, he lost his first recorded Chicago match boxing at 108 pounds, against Steve Flannigan on February 7, 1899, in a six-round point's decision at Tattersal's, an important venue in Chicago. In their February bout, Philadelphian Flanagan was considered to have had the better of the match in the last two rounds by a notable margin. Even the Chicago InterOcean gave the bout to Flanagan, but noted that Harris made his best showing in the fourth round though it was slightly in Flanagan's favor. In the first round, Harris was able to use his reach advantage to deliver his left jab effectively, but the round was still close. Flanagan was considered by many sources to have taken or competed for the 105 pound bantamweight championship of the World in February 1898 against Danny Dougherty or September 1898 against Casper Leon. He was a tough, scrappy boxer, but not a power hitter.

On September 22, and October 14, 1899, Harris drew twice with Flanagan, at the Star Theatre and the Chicago Athletic Club in Chicago. On October 16, 1900, he defeated Casper Leon in a six-round points decision at Tattersal's in Chicago.

According to Cyber Boxing Zone, on October 18, 1899, Harris defeated the accomplished bantam and featherweight Tim Callahan in a six-round points decision in Chicago, though other sources lack this record.

On January 20, 1900, as a bantamweight, Harris knocked out fellow Jewish Chicago boxer Barney Abel in the third round at the Chicago Athletic Club. Abel would later meet the great reigning featherweight champion Abe Attell. One month later on February 28, Harris would draw with Abel in Chicago in six rounds.

=== Defeating Jimmy Reagan, October 1900 ===
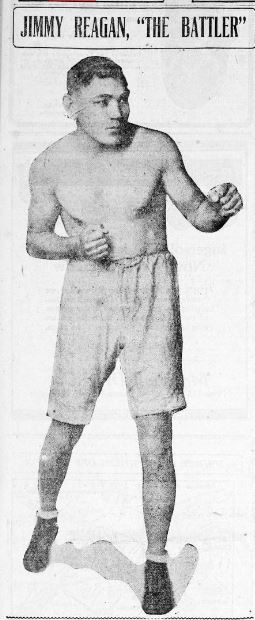
Jimmy Reagan, 1909 Bantamweight Champion

On October 26, 1900, Boxing at 118 pounds, Harris defeated Jimmy Reagan, at the Star Theater in Chicago in a six-round points decision. Reagan was an accomplished bantamweight who would later contend for the World Featherweight Championship against the long reigning champion Abe Attell in September 1903 and June 1904. In 1909, he would take the World Bantamweight Championship against Jimmy Walsh. Harris feinted well against his talented opponent in their October bout and in the second effectively used his left jab. In close infighting in the first, he had the advantage with his speed and longer reach. In the sixth and final round, Reagan tried to make up his points deficit, landing blows to Harris's neck, but Harris again used a flurry of left jabs. The referee's decision was met with approval by the crowd. Though Reagan tried to take the lead throughout the fight, Harris's left was a frequent remedy.

=== Loss to Clarence Forbes, November 1900 ===
On November 27, 1900, Harris lost one of his last six round Chicago-based fights against fellow Chicago boxer Clarence Forbes, at Tattersal's. According to the Fort Wayne Daily News, it was a close decision. It was likely one of only two decisions ever given against Harris in Chicago, and the crowd met it with mixed reactions. In the fourth round, Harris unintentionally flung Forbes to the floor, possibly during a clinch, but it had happened to Forbes earlier in the bout, and the fight continued without a problem.

On October 30, 1900, he defeated "Kid" McFadden at the Star Athletic Club in Chicago, Illinois, in a six-round points decision. On April 30, 1901, McFadden would contend with Danny Dougherty for one version of the World Bantamweight Title, winning in a ten-round disqualification in his hometown of San Francisco. McFadden would later box champion Harry Forbes in 1903.

== World Bantamweight Champ, 1901 ==
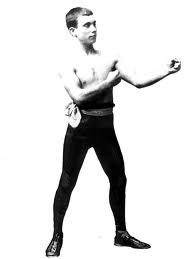
Champion Pedlar Palmer

On March 8, 1901, Harris took the World Bantamweight Championship against British boxer Pedlar Palmer at the National Sporting Club in London in a fifteen-round points decision. He had first claimed the World Bantamweight Championship when Terry McGovern abandoned it in 1899, but defeating Palmer legitimized his claim as the world's greatest bantamweight. According to boxing historian Ken Blady, Harris did not receive word of his twin brother's early death until shortly before entering the ring, moments before the beginning of the bout, which was probably timed to give him a disadvantage in the bout. Harris, tall and rangy for a bantamweight, had a five-inch height advantage over his opponent, and used it effectively in close fighting. Palmer was down on the mat repeatedly in the fifth round, once for a nine count. Palmer was the favorite in the English betting, but in the sixth to the fifteenth Harris dominated Palmer with his opponent returning to his corner in a dazed state at the closing of each round. Palmer's face was battered by the final bell.

One month later, on April 15, 1901, Harris defeated noted British boxer Harry Ware in London in a fifteen-round points decision. In an important victory, Harris had defeated another former claimant of the British World Bantamweight Championship.

=== Vacating the Championship ===
After defeating Palmer, Harris had difficulty maintaining his bantamweight status and began to box more often as a featherweight, requiring him to vacate his World Bantamweight Championship not long after returning to the United States.

On February 27, 1902, he drew in six rounds with New London boxer Austin Rice at the Pyramid Athletic Club in Chicago. Rice would contend for the World Featherweight Championship and later become a close associate and frequent opponent of fellow New London boxer and future Panamanian Heavyweight Champion Abe Hollandersky.

On March 26, 1902, Harris met Danny Daugherty at the Penn Art Club in Philadelphia, losing in a six-round newspaper decision. Daugherty had taken a version of the World Bantamweight Championship in March, May, and August 1900 against Steve Flanagan, and Tommy Feltz, though this was a version of the title recognized by few sanctioning bodies today. By the fifth round, Harris was becoming groggy, and shaking, though managed to hold off Daugherty using clinches and backing away through the rest of the bout. The fight was not considered to be a close decision. Daugherty sparred with and was mentored by the great Terry McGovern during much of his career.

By newspaper decision, in their last meeting on December 14, 1905, Harris bested fellow Jewish Chicagoan boxer Barney "Kid" Abel in three rounds at Jack Cooper's Athletic Club in New York City. Abel was an important featherweight who fought long reigning featherweight champion Abe Attell twice in 1902, and once in 1905 as well as meeting the great Benny Yanger. It was to be his last meeting with a noteworthy featherweight, and he would eventually move up to the lightweight class.

Harris was never knocked out, and finished his primary career in 1906 with a record of 15 knockouts in 39 wins, with 7 draws and 5 no decisions.

== Personal life and boxing retirement ==
Harris's twin brother Sammy, also a top boxer, died suddenly at age 20.

Harris worked briefly in theater as an actor after his boxing career. According to legend, one day while boxing he met A. L. Erlanger at the gym, who asked him for instruction in the finer points of boxing. Erlanger was impresario of Klaw and Erlanger, which ran the New Amsterdam Theater. Impressed by Harris, Erlanger brought him into the business. Harris eventually became a manager and treasurer of the Amsterdam Theater in New York City from 1902 to 1906, fighting very few bouts during the period. He married actress Desiree Lazard around 1906, while she played a lead at the Amsterdam's production of the George Cohan play Forty-five Minutes from Broadway.

=== Return to boxing in 1906–1907 ===
Returning to boxing on March 30, 1906, and February 14, 1907, he met noted lightweight Jack Goodman twice in New York in three and six round no contests.

Harris permanently retired from the ring after his third bout with lightweight Jack Goodman in June 1907 and a final bout with noted lightweight Harlem Tommy Murphy. In his final bout with Murphy in Lyric Hall in New York City, on June 3, 1907, he won in an eight-round disqualification. According to the Scranton Truth, Murphy had been doing the better fighting all the way, and was easily the better man." In the third and fourth, Harris wanted to quit the match claiming fouls, but the referee Johnny White would not allow his protests. The bout encouraged Harris to quit the ring for good and return to the theater business.

=== New York stock broker ===
By 1918, Harris was working as a broker and in 1919 purchased a seat on the New York Stock Exchange, as a member of Robinson, Duff, and Company. He made a good living working with the Stock market exchange. During his days working in theater, Harris had struck up an acquaintance with J. Robinson Duff, formerly a heavyweight boxer who had turned to Wall Street to make a living. Duff encouraged Harris to learn the ropes of trading stocks. Harris continued working as a wall street broker through 1949, with a specialty in international securities. Long after his boxing retirement, he continued to gently spar with and mentor young boxers to maintain his conditioning. One of the young boxer's Harris sparred with was future heavyweight champion Gene Tunney.

Harris died the evening of June 5, 1959 after a long illness at French Hospital, in New York City. He is survived by the Steiner family, including his two grandsons Corky and Rick Steiner, as well as his great-grandchildren, Meredith, Ricky and Joey Steiner and Ace and Duke Steiner.

Harris, who was Jewish, was inducted into the International Jewish Sports Hall of Fame in 2001. He was inducted into the International Boxing Hall of Fame in 2002.

== Professional boxing record ==
All information in this section is derived from BoxRec, unless otherwise stated.

=== Official record ===
53 fights	37 wins	2 losses
By knockout	15	0
By decision	21	2
By disqualification	1	0
Draws	7	
No contests	2	
Newspaper decisions/draws	5	

All newspaper decisions are officially regarded as “no decision” bouts and are not counted in the win/loss/draw column.

No.	Result	Record	Opponent	Type	Round	Date	Location	Age	Notes
53	Win	37–2–7 (7)	Harlem Tommy Murphy	DQ	8 (10)	Jun 3, 1907	26 years, 197 days	National S.C., Lyric Hall, New York City, New York, U.S.	
52	Win	36–2–7 (7)	Jack Goodman	NWS	6	Mar 11, 1907	26 years, 113 days	Long Acre A.C., New York City, New York, U.S.	
51	ND	36–2–7 (6)	Jack Goodman	ND	6	Feb 21, 1907	26 years, 95 days	New York City, New York, U.S.	
50	ND	36–2–7 (5)	Jack Goodman	ND	3 (?)	Mar 31, 1906	25 years, 133 days	Metropolitan A.C., New York City, New York, U.S.	
49	Win	36–2–7 (4)	Barney Abel	NWS	10	Dec 14, 1905	25 years, 26 days	Jack Cooper`s Yankee A.C., New York City, New York, U.S.	
48	Draw	36–2–7 (3)	Frank McCloskey	NWS	10	May 15, 1905	24 years, 178 days	Mount Clemens, Michigan, U.S.	
47	Loss	36–2–7 (2)	Danny Dougherty	NWS	6	Mar 26, 1902	21 years, 128 days	Penn Art Club, Philadelphia, Pennsylvania, U.S.	
46	Draw	36–2–7 (1)	Austin Rice	PTS	6	Feb 27, 1902	21 years, 81 days	Pyramid A.C., Chicago, Illinois, U.S.	
45	Win	36–2–6 (1)	Jack Chambers	KO	6 (?)	Jan 1, 1902	21 years, 44 days	United States of America	Precise date & location unknown
44	Win	35–2–6 (1)	Pedlar Palmer	PTS	15	Mar 18, 1901	20 years, 120 days	National Sporting Club, Covent Garden, London, England	Won vacant world bantamweight title
43	Win	34–2–6 (1)	Al Kirk	KO	3 (?)	Jan 1, 1901	20 years, 44 days	Chicago, Illinois, U.S.	Precise date unknown
42	Loss	33–2–6 (1)	Clarence Forbes	PTS	6	Nov 27, 1900	20 years, 9 days	Tattersall's, Chicago, Illinois, U.S.	
41	Win	33–1–6 (1)	Dennis "Kid" McFadden	PTS	6	Oct 30, 1900	19 years, 346 days	Star A.C., Chicago, Illinois, U.S.	
40	Win	32–1–6 (1)	Johnny Reagan	PTS	6	Oct 26, 1900	19 years, 342 days	Star Theatre, Chicago, Illinois, U.S.	
39	Win	31–1–6 (1)	Casper Leon	PTS	6	Oct 16, 1900	19 years, 332 days	Tattersall's, Chicago, Illinois, U.S.	
38	Win	30–1–6 (1)	Jack Ryan	PTS	6	Oct 2, 1900	19 years, 318 days	Chicago, Illinois, U.S.	
37	Win	29–1–6 (1)	Patsy Donovan	NWS	6	Sep 21, 1900	19 years, 307 days	Industrial Hall, Philadelphia, Pennsylvania, U.S.	
36	Win	29–1–6	Tony Moran	PTS	10	Jul 16, 1900	19 years, 240 days	Madison Square Garden, New York City, New York, U.S.	
35	Win	28–1–6	Buddy Ryan	PTS	6	May 29, 1900	19 years, 192 days	Tattersall's, Chicago, Illinois, U.S.	
34	Draw	27–1–6	Maurice Rauch	PTS	6	May 25, 1900	19 years, 188 days	Star Theatre, Chicago, Illinois, U.S.	
33	Draw	27–1–5	Barney Abel	PTS	6	Feb 28, 1900	19 years, 102 days	Chicago, Illinois, U.S.	
32	Win	27–1–4	Kid Carter	KO	2 (?)	Jan 27, 1900	19 years, 70 days	Chicago, Illinois, U.S.	
31	Win	26–1–4	Barney Abel	KO	3 (6)	Jan 20, 1900	19 years, 63 days	Chicago A.A., Chicago, Illinois, U.S.	
30	Win	25–1–4	Billy Casey	KO	5 (?)	Nov 14, 1899	18 years, 361 days	Chicago, Illinois, U.S.	
29	Draw	24–1–4	Steve Flanagan	PTS	6	Oct 14, 1899	18 years, 330 days	Chicago A.A., Chicago, Illinois, U.S.	
28	Draw	24–1–3	Steve Flanagan	PTS	6	Sep 22, 1899	18 years, 308 days	Star Theatre, Chicago, Illinois, U.S.	
27	Draw	24–1–2	Jimmy Barry	PTS	6	Sep 1, 1899	18 years, 287 days	Star Theatre, Chicago, Illinois, U.S.	
26	Win	24–1–1	Joe Hugelett	TKO	3 (?)	Aug 10, 1899	18 years, 265 days	Saengerfest Hall, Davenport, Iowa, U.S.	
25	Win	23–1–1	Sig Hart	KO	6 (?)	Aug 4, 1899	18 years, 259 days	Jack Leonard's Club, Clinton, Iowa, U.S.	
24	Win	22–1–1	Sig Hart	PTS	15	Jul 7, 1899	18 years, 231 days	Tri-City A.C., Davenport, Iowa, U.S.	
23	Win	21–1–1	Torpedo Billy Murphy	KO	4 (6)	May 19, 1899	18 years, 182 days	Star Theatre, Chicago, Illinois, U.S.	
22	Win	20–1–1	Larry Lacey	KO	1 (?)	Mar 17, 1899	18 years, 119 days	Dearborn A.C., Chicago, Illinois, U.S.	
21	Win	19–1–1	Dick Sleif	KO	1 (?)	Feb 24, 1899	18 years, 98 days	Dearborn A.C., Chicago, Illinois, U.S.	
20	Loss	18–1–1	Steve Flanagan	PTS	6	Feb 7, 1899	18 years, 81 days	Tattersall's, Chicago, Illinois, U.S.	
19	Win	18–0–1	George Pardy	PTS	6	Jan 28, 1899	18 years, 71 days	Chicago A.A., Chicago, Illinois, U.S.	
18	Win	17–0–1	Kid Purdy	PTS	6	Jan 24, 1899	18 years, 67 days	Chicago, Illinois, U.S.	
17	Win	16–0–1	Charles Roden	TKO	9 (10)	Nov 22, 1898	18 years, 4 days	Lenox A.C., New York City, New York, U.S.	
16	Win	15–0–1	Pinky Evans	PTS	10	Nov 12, 1898	17 years, 359 days	Pelican A.C., New York City, New York, U.S.	
15	Win	14–0–1	Billy Kid Trueman	TKO	6 (?)	Oct 14, 1898	17 years, 330 days	Lenox A.C., New York City, New York, U.S.	
14	Win	13–0–1	Tut Reilly	KO	9 (10)	Sep 24, 1898	17 years, 310 days	Pelican A.C., New York City, New York, U.S.	
13	Win	12–0–1	George Ross	PTS	10	Sep 9, 1898	17 years, 295 days	Lenox A.C., New York City, New York, U.S.	
12	Win	11–0–1	Maurice Rauch	PTS	6	Apr 16, 1898	17 years, 149 days	America A.A., Chicago, Illinois, U.S.	
11	Win	10–0–1	Maurice Rauch	PTS	6	Apr 2, 1898	17 years, 135 days	America A.A., Chicago, Illinois, U.S.	
10	Win	9–0–1	Williams	PTS	6	Mar 19, 1898	17 years, 121 days	America A.A., Chicago, Illinois, U.S.	
9	Win	8–0–1	Link Pope	TKO	4 (6)	Mar 17, 1898	17 years, 119 days	Tattersall's, Chicago, Illinois, U.S.	
8	Draw	7–0–1	Maurice Rauch	PTS	6	Dec 27, 1897	17 years, 39 days	Winter Circus Building, Chicago, Illinois, U.S.	
7	Win	7–0	Lee LaBlanche	PTS	5	Nov 18, 1897	17 years, 0 days	Coliseum, Saint Louis, Missouri, U.S.	
6	Win	6–0	Chick Brooker	KO	1 (?)	Nov 13, 1897	16 years, 360 days	Chicago A.A., Chicago, Illinois, U.S.	
5	Win	5–0	Lee LaBlanche	PTS	4	Oct 16, 1897	16 years, 332 days	Chicago A.A., Chicago, Illinois, U.S.	
4	Win	4–0	Dave Rosenberg	PTS	3	Oct 4, 1897	16 years, 320 days	Chicago, Illinois, U.S.	
3	Win	3–0	Archie Bernard	KO	2 (?)	Sep 2, 1896	15 years, 289 days	Chicago, Illinois, U.S.	
2	Win	2–0	Young Sweeney	PTS	4	Jun 12, 1896	15 years, 207 days	Chicago, Illinois, U.S.	
1	Win	1–0	Dennis Mahoney	PTS	5	Apr 5, 1896	15 years, 139 days	Chicago, Illinois, U.S.	

=== Unofficial record ===
53 fights	40 wins	3 losses
By knockout	15	0
By decision	24	3
By disqualification	1	0
Draws	8	
No contests	2	

Record with the inclusion of newspaper decisions in the win/loss/draw column.

No.	Result	Record	Opponent	Type	Round	Date	Age	Location	Notes
53	Win	40–3–8 (2)	Harlem Tommy Murphy	DQ	8 (10)	Jun 3, 1907	26 years, 197 days	National S.C., Lyric Hall, New York City, New York, U.S.	
52	Win	39–3–8 (2)	Jack Goodman	NWS	6	Mar 11, 1907	26 years, 113 days	Long Acre A.C., New York City, New York, U.S.	
51	ND	38–3–8 (2)	Jack Goodman	ND	6	Feb 21, 1907	26 years, 95 days	New York City, New York, U.S.	
50	ND	38–3–8 (1)	Jack Goodman	ND	3 (?)	Mar 31, 1906	25 years, 133 days	Metropolitan A.C., New York City, New York, U.S.	
49	Win	38–3–8	Barney Abel	NWS	10	Dec 14, 1905	25 years, 26 days	Jack Cooper`s Yankee A.C., New York City, New York, U.S.	
48	Draw	37–3–8	Frank McCloskey	NWS	10	May 15, 1905	24 years, 178 days	Mount Clemens, Michigan, U.S.	
47	Loss	37–3–7	Danny Dougherty	NWS	6	Mar 26, 1902	21 years, 128 days	Penn Art Club, Philadelphia, Pennsylvania, U.S.	
46	Draw	37–2–7	Austin Rice	PTS	6	Feb 27, 1902	21 years, 81 days	Pyramid A.C., Chicago, Illinois, U.S.	
45	Win	37–2–6	Jack Chambers	KO	6 (?)	Jan 1, 1902	21 years, 44 days	United States of America	Precise date & location unknown
44	Win	36–2–6	Pedlar Palmer	PTS	15	Mar 18, 1901	20 years, 120 days	National Sporting Club, Covent Garden, London, England	Won vacant world bantamweight title
43	Win	35–2–6	Al Kirk	KO	3 (?)	Jan 1, 1901	20 years, 44 days	Chicago, Illinois, U.S.	Precise date unknown
42	Loss	34–2–6	Clarence Forbes	PTS	6	Nov 27, 1900	20 years, 9 days	Tattersall's, Chicago, Illinois, U.S.	
41	Win	34–1–6	Dennis "Kid" McFadden	PTS	6	Oct 30, 1900	19 years, 346 days	Star A.C., Chicago, Illinois, U.S.	
40	Win	33–1–6	Johnny Reagan	PTS	6	Oct 26, 1900	19 years, 342 days	Star Theatre, Chicago, Illinois, U.S.	
39	Win	32–1–6	Casper Leon	PTS	6	Oct 16, 1900	19 years, 332 days	Tattersall's, Chicago, Illinois, U.S.	
38	Win	31–1–6	Jack Ryan	PTS	6	Oct 2, 1900	19 years, 318 days	Chicago, Illinois, U.S.	
37	Win	30–1–6	Patsy Donovan	NWS	6	Sep 21, 1900	19 years, 307 days	Industrial Hall, Philadelphia, Pennsylvania, U.S.	
36	Win	29–1–6	Tony Moran	PTS	10	Jul 16, 1900	19 years, 240 days	Madison Square Garden, New York City, New York, U.S.	
35	Win	28–1–6	Buddy Ryan	PTS	6	May 29, 1900	19 years, 192 days	Tattersall's, Chicago, Illinois, U.S.	
34	Draw	27–1–6	Maurice Rauch	PTS	6	May 25, 1900	19 years, 188 days	Star Theatre, Chicago, Illinois, U.S.	
33	Draw	27–1–5	Barney Abel	PTS	6	Feb 28, 1900	19 years, 102 days	Chicago, Illinois, U.S.	
32	Win	27–1–4	Kid Carter	KO	2 (?)	Jan 27, 1900	19 years, 70 days	Chicago, Illinois, U.S.	
31	Win	26–1–4	Barney Abel	KO	3 (6)	Jan 20, 1900	19 years, 63 days	Chicago A.A., Chicago, Illinois, U.S.	
30	Win	25–1–4	Billy Casey	KO	5 (?)	Nov 14, 1899	18 years, 361 days	Chicago, Illinois, U.S.	
29	Draw	24–1–4	Steve Flanagan	PTS	6	Oct 14, 1899	18 years, 330 days	Chicago A.A., Chicago, Illinois, U.S.	
28	Draw	24–1–3	Steve Flanagan	PTS	6	Sep 22, 1899	18 years, 308 days	Star Theatre, Chicago, Illinois, U.S.	
27	Draw	24–1–2	Jimmy Barry	PTS	6	Sep 1, 1899	18 years, 287 days	Star Theatre, Chicago, Illinois, U.S.	
26	Win	24–1–1	Joe Hugelett	TKO	3 (?)	Aug 10, 1899	18 years, 265 days	Saengerfest Hall, Davenport, Iowa, U.S.	
25	Win	23–1–1	Sig Hart	KO	6 (?)	Aug 4, 1899	18 years, 259 days	Jack Leonard's Club, Clinton, Iowa, U.S.	
24	Win	22–1–1	Sig Hart	PTS	15	Jul 7, 1899	18 years, 231 days	Tri-City A.C., Davenport, Iowa, U.S.	
23	Win	21–1–1	Torpedo Billy Murphy	KO	4 (6)	May 19, 1899	18 years, 182 days	Star Theatre, Chicago, Illinois, U.S.	
22	Win	20–1–1	Larry Lacey	KO	1 (?)	Mar 17, 1899	18 years, 119 days	Dearborn A.C., Chicago, Illinois, U.S.	
21	Win	19–1–1	Dick Sleif	KO	1 (?)	Feb 24, 1899	18 years, 98 days	Dearborn A.C., Chicago, Illinois, U.S.	
20	Loss	18–1–1	Steve Flanagan	PTS	6	Feb 7, 1899	18 years, 81 days	Tattersall's, Chicago, Illinois, U.S.	
19	Win	18–0–1	George Pardy	PTS	6	Jan 28, 1899	18 years, 71 days	Chicago A.A., Chicago, Illinois, U.S.	
18	Win	17–0–1	Kid Purdy	PTS	6	Jan 24, 1899	18 years, 67 days	Chicago, Illinois, U.S.	
17	Win	16–0–1	Charles Roden	TKO	9 (10)	Nov 22, 1898	18 years, 4 days	Lenox A.C., New York City, New York, U.S.	
16	Win	15–0–1	Pinky Evans	PTS	10	Nov 12, 1898	17 years, 359 days	Pelican A.C., New York City, New York, U.S.	
15	Win	14–0–1	Billy Kid Trueman	TKO	6 (?)	Oct 14, 1898	17 years, 330 days	Lenox A.C., New York City, New York, U.S.	
14	Win	13–0–1	Tut Reilly	KO	9 (10)	Sep 24, 1898	17 years, 310 days	Pelican A.C., New York City, New York, U.S.	
13	Win	12–0–1	George Ross	PTS	10	Sep 9, 1898	17 years, 295 days	Lenox A.C., New York City, New York, U.S.	
12	Win	11–0–1	Maurice Rauch	PTS	6	Apr 16, 1898	17 years, 149 days	America A.A., Chicago, Illinois, U.S.	
11	Win	10–0–1	Maurice Rauch	PTS	6	Apr 2, 1898	17 years, 135 days	America A.A., Chicago, Illinois, U.S.	
10	Win	9–0–1	Williams	PTS	6	Mar 19, 1898	17 years, 121 days	America A.A., Chicago, Illinois, U.S.	
9	Win	8–0–1	Link Pope	TKO	4 (6)	Mar 17, 1898	17 years, 119 days	Tattersall's, Chicago, Illinois, U.S.	
8	Draw	7–0–1	Maurice Rauch	PTS	6	Dec 27, 1897	17 years, 39 days	Winter Circus Building, Chicago, Illinois, U.S.	
7	Win	7–0	Lee LaBlanche	PTS	5	Nov 18, 1897	17 years, 0 days	Coliseum, Saint Louis, Missouri, U.S.	
6	Win	6–0	Chick Brooker	KO	1 (?)	Nov 13, 1897	16 years, 360 days	Chicago A.A., Chicago, Illinois, U.S.	
5	Win	5–0	Lee LaBlanche	PTS	4	Oct 16, 1897	16 years, 332 days	Chicago A.A., Chicago, Illinois, U.S.	
4	Win	4–0	Dave Rosenberg	PTS	3	Oct 4, 1897	16 years, 320 days	Chicago, Illinois, U.S.	
3	Win	3–0	Archie Bernard	KO	2 (?)	Sep 2, 1896	15 years, 289 days	Chicago, Illinois, U.S.	
2	Win	2–0	Young Sweeney	PTS	4	Jun 12, 1896	15 years, 207 days	Chicago, Illinois, U.S.	
1	Win	1–0	Dennis Mahoney	PTS	5	Apr 5, 1896	15 years, 139 days	Chicago, Illinois, U.S.	

== See also ==
- Lineal championship
- List of bantamweight boxing champions
- List of select Jewish boxers

Achievements
Vacant Title last held by Terry McGovern	World Bantamweight Champion; March 8, 1901 – Vacated	Succeeded by Harry Forbes
