= Patsy Sweeney =

Irish American boxer (1879-1948)

- Sweeney's photo from the 1899-1903 Police Gazette collection

Personal information
- Nickname: Manchester Whirlwind
- Born: Patrick Joseph Sweeney; March 3, 1879 Clifden, County Galway, Ireland
- Died: June 22, 1948 (aged 69) Manchester, New Hampshire, US
- Height: 5 ft 7 1/2 in (1.71 m)
- Weight: Featherweight; Lightweight

Boxing career

Boxing record
- Total fights: 101; with the inclusion of newspaper decisions
- Wins: 51
- Win by KO: 34
- Losses: 21
- Draws: 22

Patsy Sweeney was an American lightweight boxer of Irish descent. In boxing circles, he was called the "Manchester Whirlwind".

== Early life ==
Patrick "Patsy" Joseph Sweeney was born on March 3, 1879, in Clifden, County Galway, Ireland, to Peter Sweeney and Honorah "Nora" Lydon Sweeney. He emigrated to the United States from Canada with his parents and siblings in 1892, and the family settled in Manchester, New Hampshire. He and his brothers, John and Peter, all boxed professionally, but John and Peter never achieved the same level of success in the boxing ring as Patsy.

== Professional career ==
Patsy Sweeney was slight of stature, standing 5'7½" tall and weighing 133 pounds. He boxed in the featherweight and lightweight classes. His manager was Tom Maguire. Sweeney's first three professional matches were against Billy Gardner, Jimmy Gardner's brother. All three of those matches ended in draws, as would the next four against similarly inexperienced opponents. Sweeney scored his first win in a match against Spike Haley on October 10, 1898, in Boston, Massachusetts. Over the next four years, he would score 48 wins, 11 losses, and 14 draws, fighting in venues across the Northeastern United States, from his hometown in Manchester, New Hampshire, to Boston, New York, Philadelphia, and Memphis. Sweeney's record over this period included four bouts with George "Elbows" McFadden (three losses to McFadden, one draw), two bouts with Jimmy Gardner (one loss to Gardner and one draw), two bouts with Matty Matthews (one win for Sweeney, one loss to Matthews), as well as bouts with Mosey King (win for Sweeney) and Eddie Connolly (win for Sweeney).

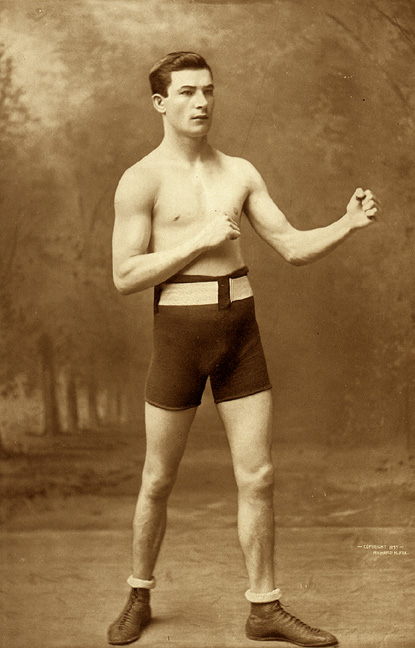
Eddie Connolly, whom Sweeney defeated on February 22, 1901

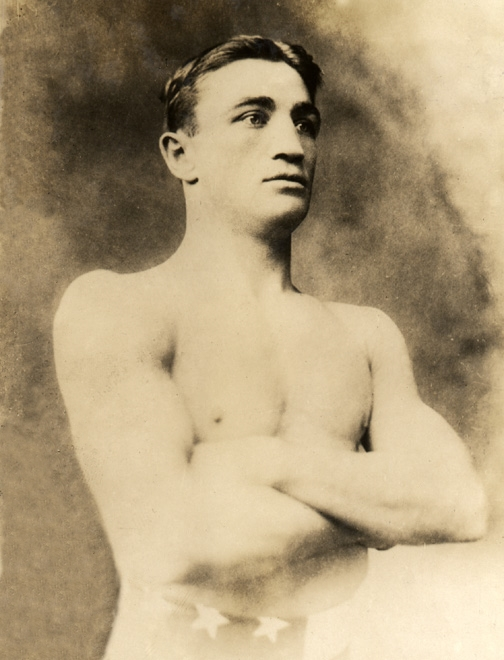
Matty Matthews. Sweeney lost to Matthews on September 2, 1901, but defeated him in a re-match on September 11, 1902.

On November 11, 1920, Sweeney met similarly sized 5'7½" Sam Langford at the Lenox Athletic Club in Boston. Although just 17 years old at the time, Langford had already amassed the impressive record of 14 wins, 1 loss, 7 draws. Sweeney was the more experienced boxer, but Langford gave him a punishing. Sweeney was down on the 2nd, 6th, and 10th rounds, and then received a knockout during the 12th round that ended the fight in a decisive win for Langford.

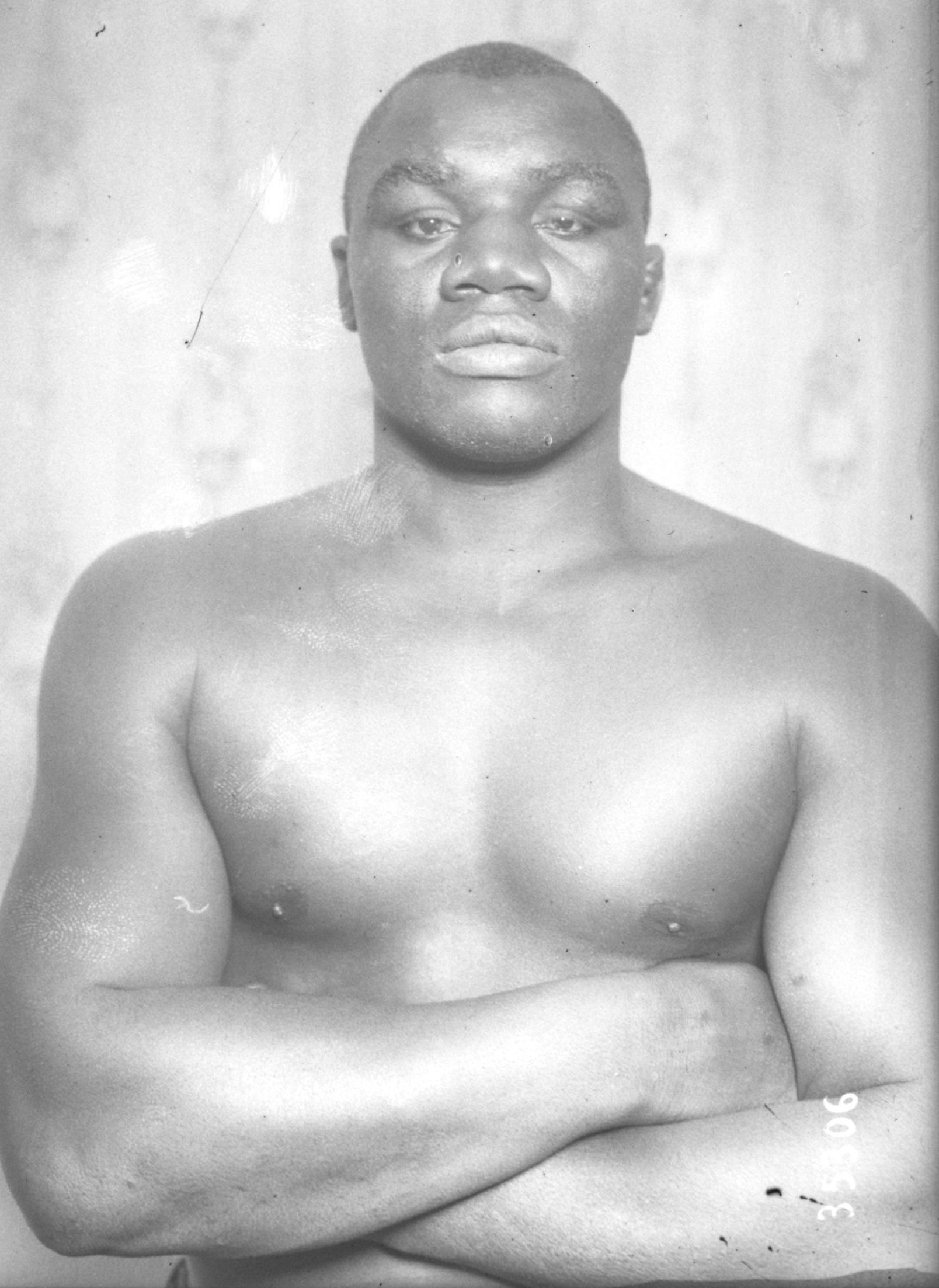
Sam Langford, who gave Sweeney a career-shattering defeat by knockout on November 20, 1903

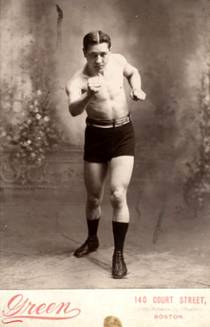
William "Honey" Mellody, who defeated Sweeney on December 25, 1903, January 21, 1904, and March 24, 1904

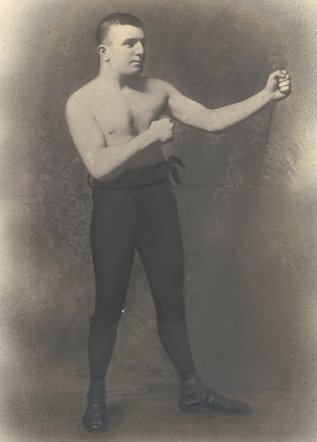
Young Griffo, who defeated Sweeney after calling foul in a private barroom fight on March 6, 1905

Langford would go on to defeat World Lightweight Champion Joe Gans barely two weeks later on December 8, 1903, and continue with an exceptionally successful career, eventually fighting in the heavyweight category, fighting and defeating men who towered over him in height. Sweeney, however, did not bounce back well from this fight with Langford. The knockout was Sweeney's first in the ring, and marked the beginning of a long slump that would result in Sweeney's eventual exit from professional boxing. Following the match with Langford, Sweeney's record was 3 wins, 11 losses, and 6 draws. During this time, Sweeney lost to William "Honey" Mellody (three losses), Jimmy Gardner, and Matty Matthews, as well as others. His last match was on October 30, 1922, against Porky Diggins in the Nashua Theater in Nashua, New Hampshire, which he lost to Diggins.

Sweeney did not confine his fighting activities to the professional boxing ring. According to boxing lore, Sweeney met Australian boxing legend Young Griffo in a private fight in a Harlem hideaway on March 6, 1905. After much drama on both sides including the upsetting of the coal-fired heat stove, Griffo cried foul in the 14th round and the match was called for Griffo.

== Personal life ==
Sweeney was married to Rosetta "Etta" Moran Sweeney of New York City. They had two children, William and Kathryn.Following his boxing career, Sweeney worked as a laborer.
