= Henry Harris (English cricketer) =

English cricketer

Personal information
- Full name: Henry Edward Harris
- Born: 6 August 1854; Brighton, Sussex, England
- Died: 8 November 1923 (aged 69); Littlehampton, Sussex, England
- Batting: Right-handed
- Relatives: Edwin Harris (son)

Domestic team information
- Years: Team
- 1880: Hampshire

Career statistics
Competition	First-class
Matches	3
Runs scored	53
Batting average	10.60
100s/50s	–/–
Top score	28
Catches/stumpings	1/–
- Source: Cricinfo, 28 January 2010

Henry Edward Harris (6 August 1854 – 8 November 1923) was an English cricketer and cricket administrator.

Harris was born at Brighton in August 1854, where he was privately educated. He was associated with Brighton Cricket Club, where he was its honorary secretary in 1875 and 1876. Relocating to Hampshire, Wheeler made three appearances in first-class cricket for Hampshire in 1880, making two appearances against Sussex and one against the Marylebone Cricket Club. He scored 53 runs in these matches, with a highest score of 28. He later returned to live in Sussex, where he was an honorary secretary of Littlehampton Cricket Club and served on the Sussex committee. Harris died at Littlehampton in November 1923. His son, Edwin, also played first-class cricket.
