= Samuel Henry Harris =

Australian surgeon (1881–1936)

Samuel Henry Harris (22 August 1881 – 25 December 1936) was an Australian surgeon who developed a new technique for prostatectomy.

Harry Harris (as he was usually known) was born in Sydney.
