= Benny Leonard =

American boxer (1896–1947)

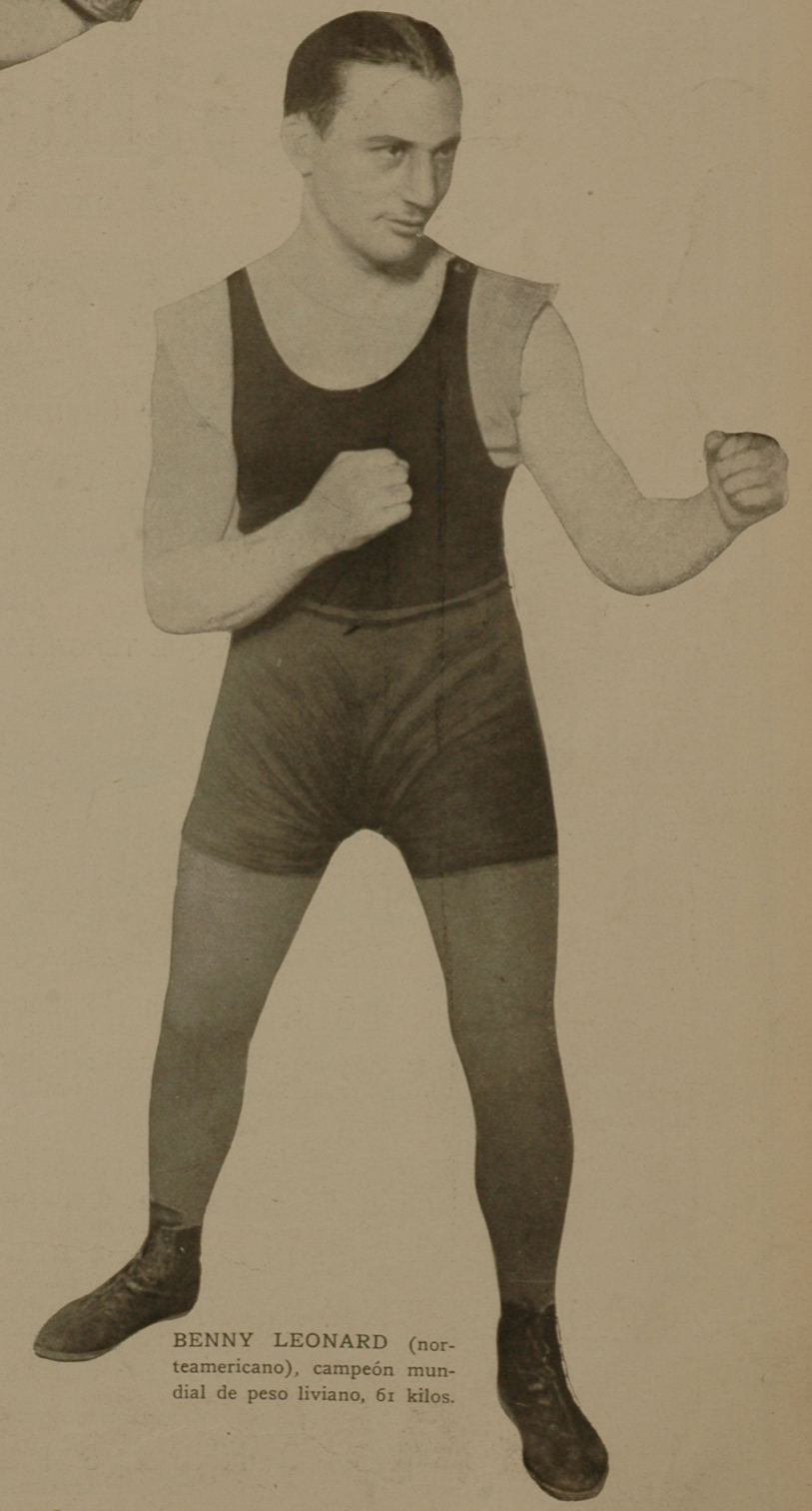
- Leonard c. 1922

Personal information
- Nicknames: Ghetto Wizard; The Great Bennah; Benny the Great
- Born: Benjamin Leiner; April 7, 1896 Lower East Side, New York City, New York, U.S.
- Died: April 18, 1947 (aged 51) St. Nicholas Arena, New York City, New York, U.S.
- Height: 5 ft 5 in (165 cm)
- Weight: Lightweight; Welterweight

Boxing career
- Reach: 69 in (175 cm)
- Stance: Orthodox

Boxing record
- Total fights: 219
- Wins: 185
- Win by KO: 70
- Losses: 22
- Draws: 9
- No contests: 3

Benny Leonard (born Benjamin Leiner; April 7, 1896 – April 18, 1947) was an American professional boxer who competed from 1911 to 1932. He held the world lightweight title from 1917 to 1925, making him the longest-reigning champion in the division's history. He is widely regarded not only as one of the greatest lightweights ever, but also as one of the sport's all-time greats.

In 1944, Leonard was awarded the Edward J. Neil Trophy by the Boxing Writers Association of New York. The Ring magazine named him Fighter of the Decade for the 1920s. Leonard was inducted into The Ring magazine Hall of Fame (1955), the International Jewish Sports Hall of Fame (1979), the World Boxing Hall of Fame (1980), the International Boxing Hall of Fame (1990), and the National Jewish Sports Hall of Fame (1996).

In 1997, The Sporting News named Leonard the "Best Boxer of the Last 75 Years". Leonard was ranked 8th on The Ring magazine's list of the "80 Best Fighters of the Last 80 Years" and placed 7th in ESPN's "50 Greatest Boxers of All-Time". In 2005, the International Boxing Research Organization ranked Leonard as the #1 lightweight, and #8 best pound for pound fighter of all time. The Ring magazine founder Nat Fleischer ranked Leonard as the 2nd-greatest lightweight of all time. Boxing historian Bert Sugar placed him 6th in his Top 100 Fighters catalogue. As of 2026, BoxRec ranked Leonard as the fifth-greatest pound for pound boxer and the greatest lightweight of all time.

== Early life ==
Benjamin Leiner was born and raised as a youth in the Jewish ghetto, located on the Lower East Side of Manhattan, New York City, near Eighth Street and Second Avenue, where he learned to fight the sons of other immigrants. His religious Jewish parents Minny and Gershon Leiner, who immigrated from Russia, disapproved of his fighting but understood his frequent need to defend himself in the poor neighborhoods in which he grew up. His father struggled to support a wife and eight children by working twelve-hour days in a garment sweatshop at twenty dollars a week. His annual take-home pay rarely eclipsed $1400.

Leiner began his professional career in 1911 at age 15. He took the Americanized name Benny Leonard to prevent his parents from discovering he had taken up professional boxing to earn extra money for them and himself.

== Professional career ==
Leonard was known for his speed, lightning reflexes, excellent boxing technique, and ability to think fast on his feet. Equally important, he taught himself to be a powerful hitter, who scored 70 Knock Outs from his 89 wins. He was defeated only twenty two times in his career and was held to a draw on few occasions. As was common in the era in which he fought, he engaged in many no-decision matches and is believed to have fought in around 219 bouts. He most distinguished himself by decisively winning over 90% of his career matches in his prime between 1921 and 1932, and winning all of his matches decided by judges and based on points.

=== Lightweight contender ===
Leonard debuted his boxing career on a Saturday in November 1911, losing in three rounds at the Fondon Athletic Club in New York. The fight was stopped because he was bleeding through the nose. He won 12 of his next 18 bouts which included three no-decisions, establishing a reputation as a good local fighter before meeting Canadian Frankie Fleming in May 1912. Leonard was knocked out for only the second time in his career. He lost a rematch with Fleming 16 months later. Not surprisingly, Fleming got the first shot at Freddie Welsh, failing to unseat the world lightweight champion in a May 1915 fight, which the newspapers awarded to Welsh.

On August 14, 1914, Leonard knocked out talented contender Tommy Houck in the seventh of ten rounds at Elmsford, New York. Apparently Leonard had learned Houck's strategy after a previous loss to him one year earlier on September 27, 1913, in a ten-round newspaper decision in Atlantic Garden, New York.

Leonard's next big test came when he took on featherweight champion Johnny Kilbane in Atlantic City in April 1915. In a close bout, Kilbane won six of ten rounds to win the decision. "Leonard might have beaten the champion if he had a little more confidence," the Chicago Tribune wrote, "but even when he was having the best of the going he shut up like a clam and clinched for all he was worth."

Leonard defeated Portuguese boxer Joe Azevedo on November 19, 1915, in Azevedo's hometown of Saratoga Springs, New York, outpointing him in all rounds but the first which was even. Azevedo needed to clinch frequently to avoid Leonard's attack. The New York Times clearly gave the decision to Leonard.

On December 17, 1915, Leonard knocked out Joe Mandot in the seventh round of a ten-round bout in Harlem. There was brilliant scientific boxing for the first six rounds, and a few sources reported that Mandot held a slight lead until the knockout. In the end, Leonard scored a decisive victory against a leading contender for the lightweight title. On his second attempt to rise in the seventh, Leonard administered a stinging right to Mandot that put him down for the count. As was his habit, Benny was effective in combinations with both gloves, wearing down Mandot with fast jolts throughout the strategically fought bout, until he could deliver the crossing right in the seventh that put Mandot down for the first time. After his second fall to the canvas, Mandot attempted to drag himself up using the ropes but was unable, and the ten count was completed with him in a seated position. His manager later commented that Mandot was sick before the fight.

In their first meeting on February 28, 1916, Leonard defeated Rocky Kansas in ten rounds in Buffalo, New York. In a complete victory, the Buffalo Courier claimed Kansas "landed only one clean blow" to Leonard's face, and that Leonard's trademark dark, center-parted hair remained smooth, and unmussed throughout the bout. Leonard was said to have "caught punches in the air", blocked Rocky's returns, dealt frequent stunning lefts, and shot his powerful right. He also dodged several of Kansas's punches with rapid and beautifully executed shifts of his torso demonstrating his superior speed and reflexes By the close of the tenth, Kansas was groggy.

=== First lightweight championship attempt, March, 1916 ===
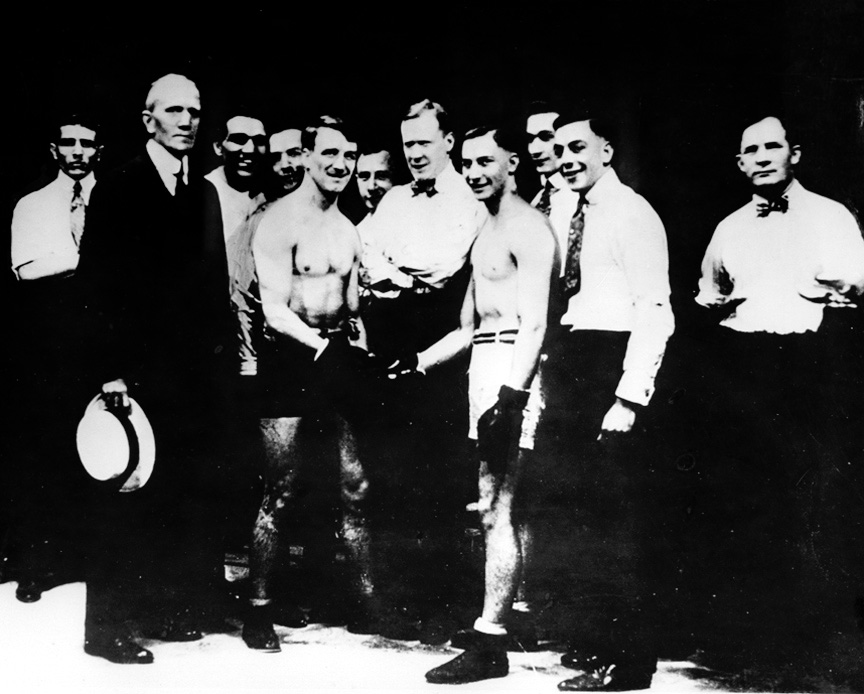
Welsh (left center) vs Leonard 1917

Leonard then reeled off a string of 15 straight victories, interrupted by two draws, which earned him the chance to meet Freddie Welsh for the lightweight championship on March 3, 1916. Although newspaper reporters at Madison Square Garden believed that Leonard had won, Welsh retained his title in a bout that was officially recorded as a no decision. The two fighters met again four months later in Brooklyn, and this time Welsh won decisively, staggering Leonard and nearly putting him down with a right to the jaw in the sixth.

Leonard met Jimmy Murphy On February 21, 1916, and won decisively in a sixth-round knockout in Philadelphia. Leonard outpointed Murphy throughout the six round contest landing more and better blows. In the sixth, Leonard landed his powerful right to Murphy's jaw, and though he rose after a brief count, Leonard again attacked with a rapid series of rights and lefts to the jaw that put Murphy down for the count and rendered him unconscious for several minutes. After the bout, Leonard's fans rushed him and carried him on their shoulders to his dressing room. The accomplished Murphy had recently outpointed reigning lightweight champion Freddie Welsh and had met Ad Wolgast, Johnny Dundee, and Pal Moore.

On March 13, 1916, Leonard defeated Sam Robideau in a six-round newspaper decision in Philadelphia. According to The Washington Post, Leonard had Robideau "almost out for the count". In the first three rounds, Robideau tried to take the lead, but Leonard waited him out and let him tire against his defense, still getting a few effective counter punches. In the fourth, he tried Robideau more, forcing him to defend against his rapid attack. In the fifth, several lefts to the jaw of Robideau weakened him, but Leonard allowed him to recover. In the sixth, Robideau tried to take the lead, and even hold at times, but Leonard broke from his holds and after a couple of shots to the jaw, and a powerful right, put Robideau on the canvas for a count of nine. When Robideau arose, he could only manage to clinch Leonard by the waist and wait for the bell. Robideau had an admirable record against many of the best lightweights of his era, including several opponents of Leonard.

Harlem native Frankie Connifrey, the 'Fighting Fireman" lost decisively to Leonard in a sixth-round technical knockout on September 14, 1916. Leonard had the edge in the first five rounds using his characteristic ringcraft to outmaneuver and outbox Conifrey who still returned a few punches of his own. In the sixth, a shower of rights and lefts by Leonard had Conifrey "out on his feet". The referee stopped the fight when one of Connifrey's seconds jumped into the ring, and a small riot ensued when around 300 of Conifrey's fans threw chairs and bottles into the ring.

In a twelfth-round technical knockout in Kansas City on October 18, 1916, Leonard convincingly defeated Ever Hammer. In the final round, Hammer's manager stopped the fight at the count of three after his boxer was knocked to the mat. Of the eleven full rounds fought by the two competitors, Leonard had eight, Hammer only two, and one was even. Hammer was considered the top contender for the lightweight title in the Midwest.

With his string of victories, Leonard had earned enough by 1916 to move his formerly struggling family from their Lower East Side ghetto to a better neighborhood in Harlem, a goal he had had since beginning his boxing career.

On January 22, 1917, Leonard beat Eddie Wallace in a six-round newspaper decision before a substantial crowd of 6,000 in Philadelphia. The Washington Post gave Leonard all six rounds. Leonard worked in machine-like form, crashing stunning punches to the head of Wallace, who had little in the way of an effective defense. Wallace was close to being knocked out by the end of round six.

On February 28, 1917, he fought onetime Bantamweight Champion Jimmy Reagan at the Manhattan Casino in Manhattan, New York, in a ten-round match, that The New York Times labeled a draw. The Des Moines Register considered Reagan having gone ten rounds without being knocked out by the extraordinary Leonard a remarkable accomplishment. According to the Ogden Standard, "Dozens of times Jimmy seemed on the point of going down, but always he kept afoot. The Standard also wrote of Leonard, that "there wasn't a punch that he didn't aim at Reagan, and there wasn't one that was forceful enough to keep the Californian at bay."

== Taking world lightweight championship, May, 1917 ==
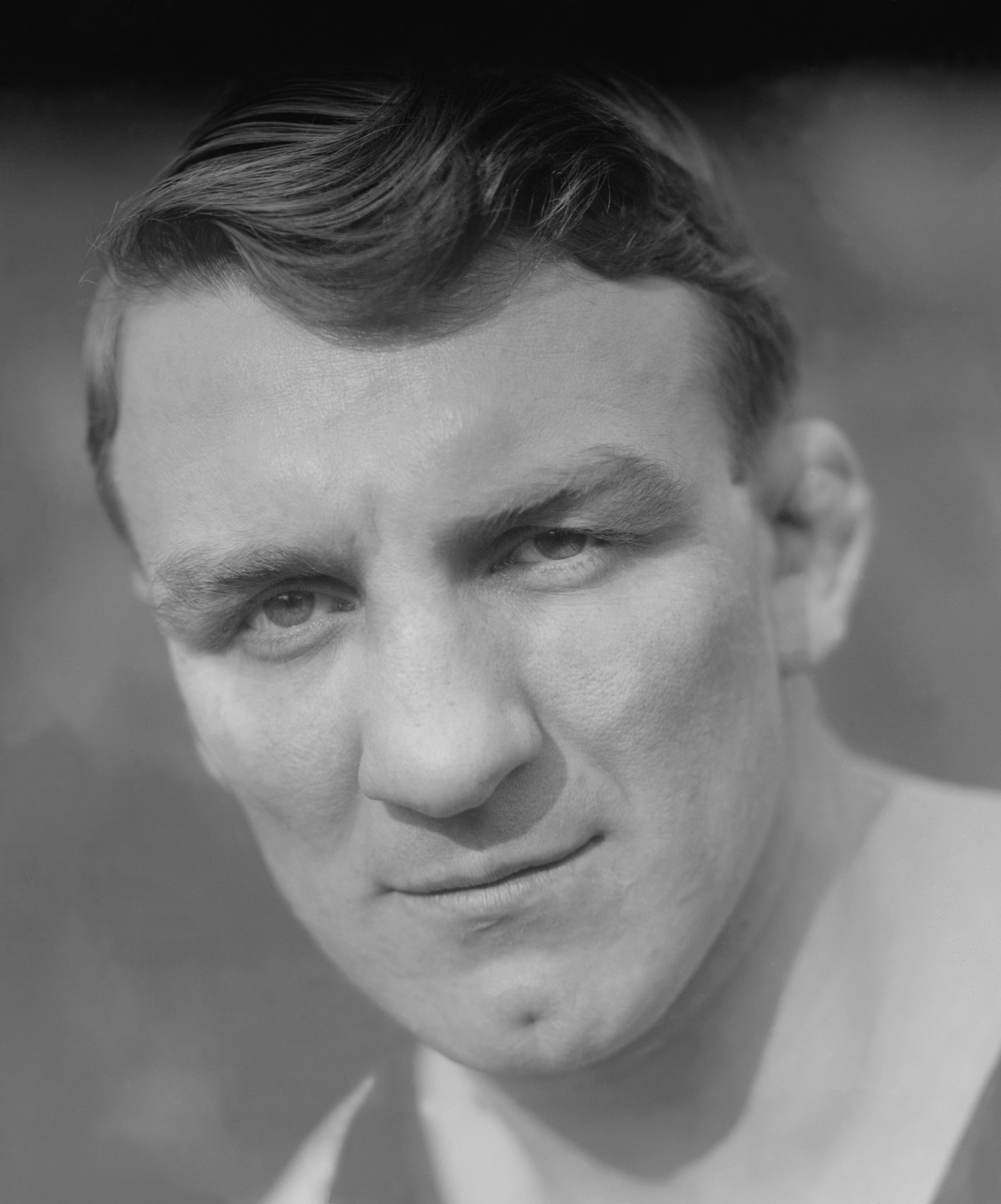
Freddie Welsh, 1920s

Winning 17 of 19 bouts after his second loss to Freddie Welsh, the 21-year-old Leonard fought lightweight champion Welsh for the third time in the Manhattan Casino on May 28, 1917. The challenger floored the champion three times in the ninth round before referee Billy McPartland stopped the fight with Welsh hanging unconscious on the ropes, making Leonard the World Lightweight Champion. Reflecting the sentiments of the perfect Jewish son, Leonard confided to the press, "My mother deserves all the credit. She always made me live right...tonight he (Welsh) showed more skill than I ever saw before...he is a game fellow. I didn't know it was the ninth round when I went after him at the finish, but I knew the time was getting short...He is a brainy fighter but I know then that his brain wasn't in control. I've always been afraid of hitting a man who was helpless like that so I didn't hit him on the chin again, I hit him on the head, hoping he would go down." Rather than a harsh blow, Leonard used a lighter one, hoping not to excessively injure his opponent. Leonard displayed sportsmanship, humility, consideration for others, and the ability to articulate the qualities that endeared him to the Jewish community of New York, and made him a great draw and a role model to many of his fans. After the bout, Leonard said he intended to enroll in the Army for WWI, where he served as a valued boxing instructor for the troops.

On June 4, 1917, Leonard defeated Joe Welsh in a six-round newspaper decision in Philadelphia. Using precision combination punching, Leonard jabbed and hooked with his left and crossed rights to the jaw of Welsh throughout the bout. He threw lightning jabs in the fifth, though their speed did not give him time to set for power. Though he tried hard in the sixth to make Welsh his sixth straight knockout victim, Benny lacked the steam and precision to send Welsh down for the count.

Johnny Nelson lost at Leonard's hometown Harlem Sports Club in New York on June 18, 1917, in a third-round technical knockout. The bout was considered Leonard's first defense of his title by some reporters, as he would have lost it if he had been knocked out by his opponent. Nelson was a strong boxer, but he was ineffective against the speed, timing and ringcraft of Leonard who was able to land more powerful punches throughout the bout. With great and unusual gifts of athleticism, Benny defeated stronger opponents without retreating by employing a more complex ring strategy executed with superior speed and agility. His ability to rarely retreat, and his long streak of knockouts, pleased his audience who considered him a true champion.

=== Victory over champion Johnny Kilbane, 1917 ===
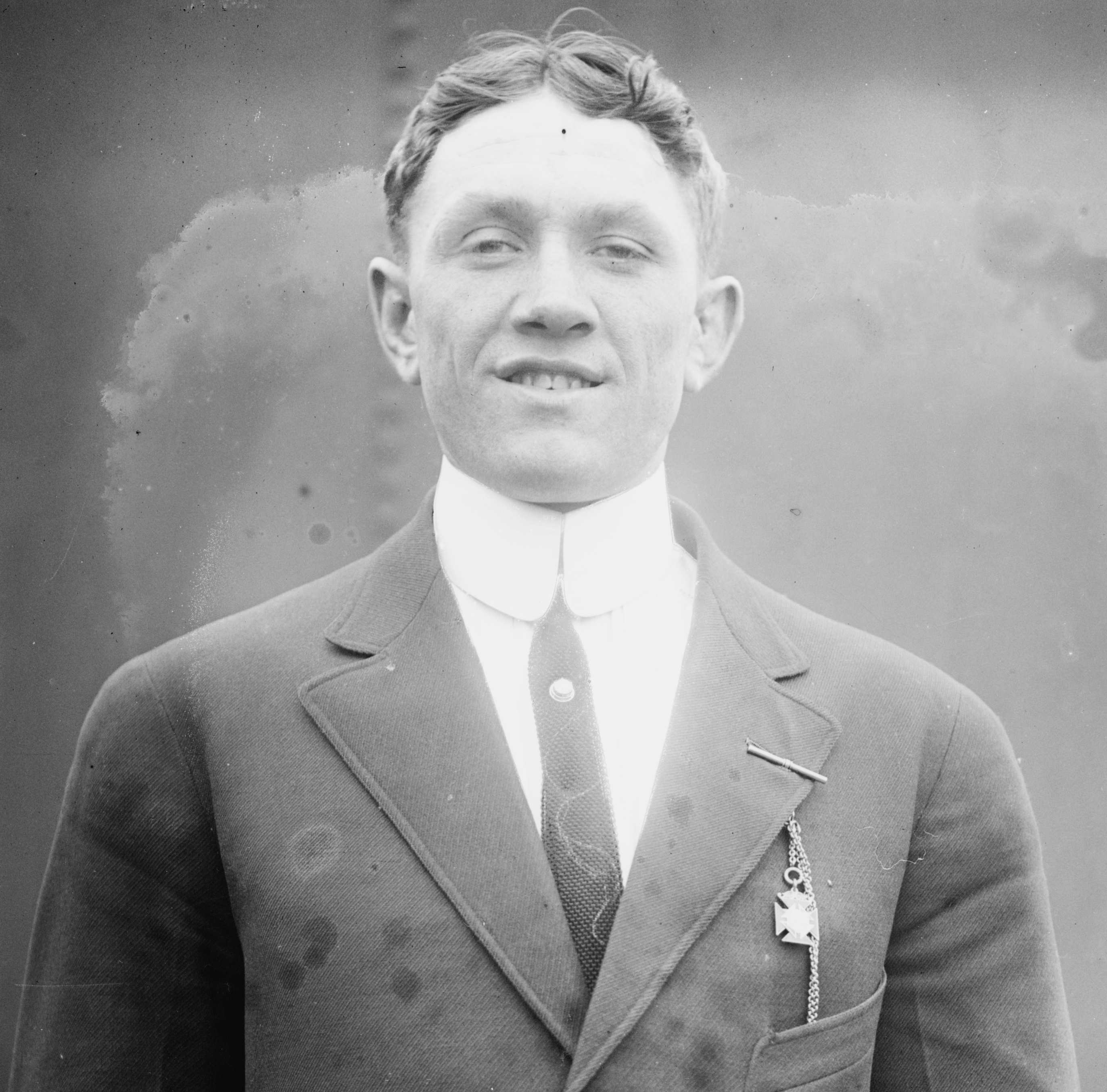
Johnny Kilbane

On July 25, 1917, Leonard defeated Johnny Kilbane, reigning world featherweight champion from 1912 to 1923, at Shibe Park in Philadelphia in a third-round technical knockout. Impressively, it was only the second knockout loss in 122 bouts for Kilbain. Biding his time in the first two rounds, Leonard knew he clearly had the edge in the third, and his blows began to land with authority, speed and precision. Twenty seconds into the round, Leonard landed a crossing right to the chin that put Kilbane against the ropes, then two more rights put him on his knees. After his manager threw in the towel, Kilbane was staggering and unable to return to his corner unaided. It was one of Leonard's most decisive wins against one of his most skilled opponents.

He officially defended the title against six different boxers over the next eight years. Leonard defeated Leo Johnson on September 21, 1917, in one of his first defenses of the World Lightweight Title and won convincingly in a first-round technical knockout.

Leoonard defeated Frank Kirke on November 28, 1917, in a stunning first-round knockout at Stockyards Stadium in Denver. Kirke was first down from a right to the body, and when he arose, Leonard hammered a right hook to the jaw that put Kirke down for the count, only 1:20 into the first round. Earlier in the first, Leonard shot rights and lefts to Kirke's jaw that caused him to cover and retreat. Leonard's speed and reflexes proved too great for Kirke who could find no adequate defense for Leonard's attack.

On December 12, 1917, Leonard defeated Patsy Cline at the Olympia Athletic Club in Philadelphia in a six-round newspaper decision. It was one of the hardest bouts of Leonard's early career, and he had to use his best defenses to guard against the attack of Cline. Leonard was forced to use speed when he had it in the early rounds to defend against Cline, though the pace of the match slowed somewhat in the fourth, fifth, and sixth. Leonard was ineffective with his left as a result of the precise right handed blocks of his opponent. In the final round, Leonard attempted to end the match with his powerful left, but was prevented again by the defense of Cline. Cline suffered most in the last two rounds when Leonard scored frequent blows against which he could not defend. Cline excelled most at short range attacks, a more difficult offense to defend, and scored with them occasionally even in the fifth, when Leonard had taken the lead. Cline prevented Leonard from attacking at long range in most instances in the early rounds by retreating or expert blocking, but in the fifth Leonard scored with a few stiff left jolts, and again dominated in the sixth, where he secured his points margin.

=== Bout with Willie Jackson, and other WWI benefits, 1918 ===
In a four-round newspaper decision at New York's shrine to boxing, Madison Square Garden, on July 16, 1918, he defeated Jewish boxer Willie Jackson. Jackson was born Oscar Tobin on the Lower East side of Manhattan, as was Leonard. In the well publicized Army benefit that raised $20,000 to buy soldiers athletic equipment, Leonard took criticism and boos among the audience for not unleashing his best punching against his highly rated lightweight opponent. In other benefits Leonard had also been reluctant to risk injury to his hands, or bring excessive injury in a match that served the community. Regardless, as was his habit, his boxing showed careful strategy, speed, and exceptional reflexes and interested most among the record crowd in the Garden. Leonard appeared far superior to Jackson in frequency of punches, defenses, and speed. He moved easily against Jackson, but threw lefts and rights at will. Leonard staged a total of four exhibition bouts in 1918 to raise war bonds for America's efforts in WWI.

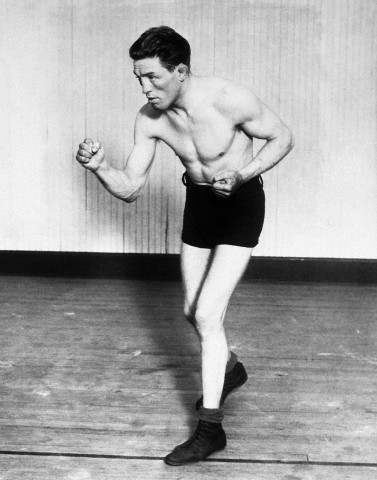
Champion Ted "Kid" Lewis

On September 23, 1918, Leonard fought a draw with future British World Welterweight Champion (BBOC) Ted Kid Lewis, another Jewish champion, before an exceptionally large crowd of 20,000 for the World Welterweight Title in Newark, New Jersey. Lewis fought cautiously for the first six rounds but opened up in the seventh and the eighth. The prestigious New York Times and New York Tribune considered the fight a draw, though a few newspapers believed Leonard had won. One reporter considered the bout farcical and lacking traditional boxing technique. The Lincoln Star, as did other papers, gave Leonard the edge five rounds to two, but noted that the bout had no knockdowns or much hard punching.

In an early win on January 13, 1919, Leonard defeated Harlem Eddie Kelly in a sixth-round newspaper decision in Philadelphia. Leonard was given four of the six rounds, with Kelly taking only the first. Harlem Eddie was given severe punishment by Leonard throughout the match. Kelly fought top lightweight talent, but usually not with a winning record.

Leonard soundly defeated Portland Jewish lightweight Joe Benjamin on the evening of January 31, 1919 in a four-round newspaper decision in San Francisco. In the opinion of the San Francisco Chronicle, Leonard could have ended the bout at any time. Showing fear, Benjamin backed away often, with Leonard inserting his left frequently in the first two rounds, but by the third, Leonard was fully in control but refrained from putting Benjamin down. By the fourth, there was so little interaction between the boxers, that many in the crowd disapproved. Benjamin would fight many highly rated lightweights, and in his later career would win against them with frequency.

Leonard defeated Harvey Thorpe in Joplin, Missouri, on the evening of March 26, 1919, in a ten-round newspaper decision of the Kansas City Star and Kansas City Times. One reporter gave all ten rounds to Leonard and considered his victory an "easy win". Leonard had soundly defeated Thorpe earlier in November 1916 in a twelve-round knockout in St. Louis. Although Thorpe fought several top rated lightweights, including Charley White, Ritchie Mitchell, and Lew Tendler, his record was poor against them, and he never competed for a world championship, though he took the Southwest lightweight title in July 1917.

Leonard defeated fellow Russian-born, New York Jewish lightweight Johnny Clinton, born Morris Elstein, on September 8, 1919, at the Arena in Syracuse in a ten-round newspaper decision. Benny led throughout the fight, using his left jab and right uppercut effectively and often, demonstrating his ability to adjust his punching combinations to the style of any given opponent as an opening occurred. Clinton was in the greatest distress in the sixth, when he appeared to be hanging on the ropes on the verge of a knockout instants before the bell, and was nearly floored again in the tenth, when Leonard attempted to finish the bout. The Pittsburgh Post wrote that Leonard deserved every one of the ten rounds.

In their final meeting on October 15, 1919, Leonard defeated fellow Jewish boxer Phil Bloom decisively in Detroit in a ten-round newspaper decision of The Detroit News. Leonard came close to a knockout in three of the rounds. As a fellow Jewish New Yorker who could draw the Jewish crowd, Bloom fought Leonard in seven previous meetings extending back to January, 1914, but with little success. Leonard had previously defeated Bloom five times with one draw and only one loss according to newspaper decisions. Bloom competed against top talent, but would never obtain a title shot in his prolific twelve-year career in the ring. After his boxing career ended, he appeared in a number of boxing movies usually shot near Los Angeles.

On November 17, 1919, Leonard defeated Lockport Jimmy Duffy in a second-round technical knockout of a fifteen-round match at the Convention Hall in Tulsa. The bout was billed as a World Lightweight Title match. In a peculiar spectacle, and decisive one-sided victory, Duffy was knocked down three times in each round, with the referee stopping the bout on his last fall to the canvas. Spectators suspected Duffy was intentionally not putting up a fight.

Leonard defeated Mel Coogan On December 10, 1919, in a second-round technical knockout at the fourth regiment armory in Jersey City. In a convincing victory, Coogan was knocked to the mat three times in the second round. The first two knockdowns were for counts of eight, with the third resulting in the fight being called. Coogan fought many of the top lightweights of the day, including Lew Tendler, and many of Leonard's opponents, and had an admirable record against them.

Leonard defeated Red Herring on December 19, 1919, in an early sixth-round technical knockout in Memphis, Tennessee. Leonard outmaneuvered Herring with speed and footwork, slipping the half dozen punches thrown by his opponent, with most going well wide of their mark. By the fifth, Herring was helpless against the ropes with the crowd roaring for Leonard to finish the match. Leonard fought with a deadly left, and sent terrific blows to the head and body. One minute into the sixth, Leonard backed Herring into a neutral corner and put him on the canvas with three short rights to the jaw, that led the referee to end the bout at 1:10, after Herring attempted to rise after his first count. The Arkansas Democrat gave Leonard five rounds, with the fourth even. Herring remained on his feet through the first five rounds, but took considerable punishment from the lightweight champion.

==== Johnny Dundee, 1920 ====
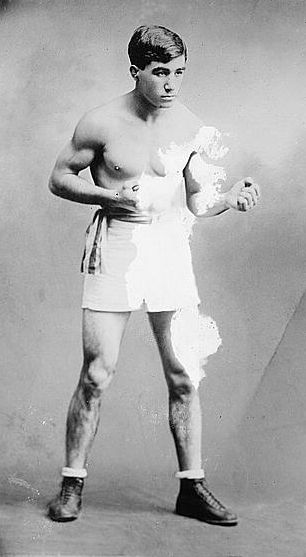
Champion Johnny Dundee

In their last match, on February 9, 1920, Leonard defeated one of his most frequent opponents, future World Jr. Lightweight and Featherweight champion Johnny Dundee, in an eight-round newspaper decision many reporters considered a title match at the Armory in Jersey City. One reporter felt Leonard had simply outpunched his opponent in every round, though Dundee put up a stiff defense. In six previous matches, Leonard had two wins, two losses, and two draws, at least according to the decisions of the more trustworthy newspapers. In their February bout, Leonard delivered several effective uppercuts to Dundee during the infighting, but Dundee make a valiant attack in the first three rounds. Afterwards, Leonard went on the defensive, and built a margin in blows delivered, winning on points.

==== Charley White, July, 1920 ====
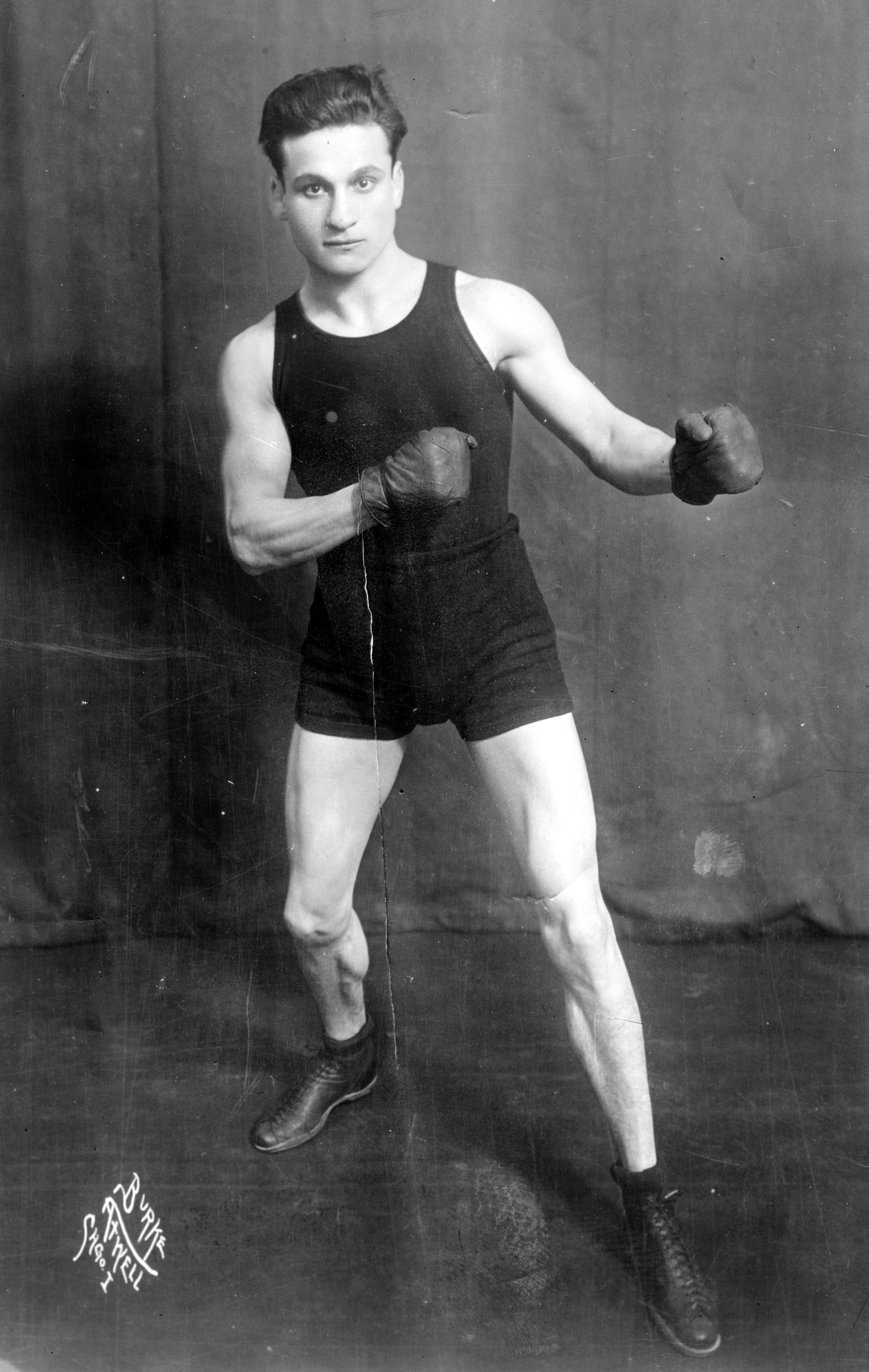
A young Charley White

On July 5, 1920, Leonard defeated Jewish boxer and exceptional Chicago lightweight, Charley White, in a ninth-round knockout before an audience of 12,000 at Benton Harbor, Michigan. The fight was a careful battle of boxing strategy, but White always held the potential for stronger punching with his left hook. Leonard may have won largely due to his faster reaction time, and reflexes, against an opponent who was nearly his equal at times. He showed better speed and agility, and used footwork to gain advantages in the angle of his attack. The hard punching White knocked Leonard out of the ring in the fifth round with his left hook, but by the ninth, White was down five times, finally landing on the canvas for the count from a right cross from Leonard. Benny had been looking for an opening since the eighth, and found it after he opened White up with his left jab, and dealt the final right cross in the ninth. Though he had continued to train, Leonard may have performed better if he had not just taken five months off from prizefighting while living in Hollywood. It was one of White's better showings, as he dominated the infighting, and appeared to have thrown more punches, but he fought against an opponent who simply refused to be beaten.

Leonard defeated Joe Welling on November 27, 1920, before an estimated crowd of 12,000, at Madison Square Garden in a World Lightweight Title match. The bout resulted in a fourteenth-round technical knockout for Leonard. Both boxers weighed in within a pound of 135. Welling shone only in the fifth round, and by the tenth seemed able to continue, but had no chance of success against Leonard. In the thirteenth Leonard sent Welling down three times. In the fourteenth, Leonard sent Welling to the canvas for a count of nine, and the referee, stepping between the two boxers, ruled a technical knockout, ending the fight, 1:07 into the round. The lack of compassion in the boxing crowd was noted by one reporter, who wrote that the audience was disappointed by referee Haukup's decision to end the bout in the thirteenth. He believed they would have enjoyed seeing two more rounds of punishment given to Welling by the reigning lightweight champion. By today's rules, the bout would have stopped in the thirteenth, before Welling had been sent to the canvas for the third time. On a lighter note, Charlie Chaplain performed before the opening bell and Leonard received a world lightweight championship belt from Tex Rickard, manager of the Garden and legendary heavyweight Jack Dempsey, at the end of the match.

==== Pal Moran and Ritchie Mitchell, 1920-1 ====
On September 25, 1920, Leonard defeated Pal Moran in a ten-round newspaper decision in East Chicago before a substantial crowd of 10,000. Only occasionally did Moran break through the champion's defenses, and Leonard always had a remedy. Benny could not get started in the early rounds, but in the last four he took the lead. Leonard scored frequently with swift left jabs and powerful right crosses. In the seventh through the tenth, Leonard seemed continuously on the verge of scoring a knockout, but Moran fought gamely on.

On October 4, 1920, Leonard soundly defeated Frankie Britt in Hartford, Connecticut in a five-round technical knockout. At the end of the contest, the referee stopped the bout to save Britt from a knockout, as Leonard had been striking him repeatedly.

Before a capacity crowd, Leonard scored an easy victory over KO Willie Loughlin on the evening of November 12, 1920 at the Camden Sporting Club in Camden, New Jersey in a ten-round newspaper decision. Leonard began cautiously wary of the skills and two inch longer reach of Loughlin, whom he had met previously. In the last three rounds, Leonard used his punching power, though it was met with frequent, but less effective blows from Loughlin. In the fourth, Leonard's jabs to Loughlin's face were frequent, but Loughlin continued his defense and never retreated. In the fifth, Leonard scored more punches, and began to take a point's margin, but not without receiving a few blows from his opponent. In the ninth, Leonard tried to end the fight with uppercuts, but could not deliver a knockdown blow to Loughlin who remained on his feet even through the exchange of blows in the tenth. Leonard knocked Loughlin across the ring and staggered him at times, but Loughlin's ability to take punishment repeatedly saved him from a knockout.

Leonard defeated Ritchie Mitchell in six of fifteen rounds on January 14, 1921, in a tough world lightweight championship bout in Madison Square Garden. Atypically, Leonard was down in the first round for a count of nine, when his alarmed seconds applied salts. In an incredible first round, Mitchell was down as well for a count of nine from a right to the stomach by Leonard, and down twice more before the bell. With a hook to the stomach, and a right to the jaw, Mitchell went down for a count of nine in the sixth. Mitchell was up, before Leonard with a flurry of punches put him down again. On his third trip to the mat, the referee called the bout. By today's rules, the fight would have ended shortly after the second knockdown. A significant portion of the gate proceeds of $75,000 were given to aid war torn France.

==== Victories over champion Rocky Kansas, 1921-2 ====
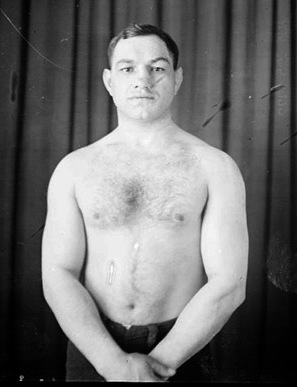
Rocky Kansas

On June 6, 1921, Leonard defeated future lightweight champion Rocky Kansas in a twelve-round world lightweight title match, before a roaring crowd of 28,000 at a baseball park in Harrison, New Jersey, winning by newspaper decision. The title would have gone to Kansas if he had scored a knockout before the end of the match. The Sheboygan Press gave Leonard the win, and nine rounds with only two to Kansas. Perhaps feeling fatigued, Leonard was said to have fought conservatively and uncharacteristically punched on the defensive throughout the match. Only in the eighth, ninth, and twelfth, did Leonard go on the aggressive. Showing his versatility, Leonard was judged to have won by a clear margin, scoring points through the attacks of Kansas in as many as nine of the rounds, despite never taking the offensive. Kansas's blows appeared wild against the precise technique of his champion opponent.

On November 22, 1921, Leonard defeated Sailor Friedman in Philadelphia in a ten-round newspaper decision of the top three newspapers in the area. In the early rounds, Leonard piled up a sizable margin on points due to the understandable reluctance of Friedman to attack the lightweight champion. The fight was action packed throughout, but Leonard took the lead in most rounds, and gained a sizable advantage by the end of the bout. As both fighters were above the lightweight limit, the contest could not be deemed a title match.

Leonard defeated Tim Droney on December 20, 1921, at the Ice Palace in Philadelphia in an eight-round decision of three leading Philadelphia newspapers. In a complete victory, The Philadelphia Inquirer gave Leonard every round but the fourth, when Leonard retreated to rest and allow Droney to take the offense. Nonetheless, Droney landed only one solid right to the jaw of Leonard in the round. Oddly, Leonard leapt in the air in a few instances to avoid the blows of Droney, and though the move was effective, it was done primarily to amuse the crowd. Leonard was said to display "wonderful ring work, and amazing speed". Droney fought gamely and remained on his feet throughout the bout, though most reporters believed Leonard could have knocked him out in the final rounds, as he was defenseless by the seventh and eighth. Droney fought some outstanding lightweights, but his record against the better contenders was poor in his later career. Both boxers fought in the lightweight range near 140.

Leonard defeated Rocky Kansas again on February 10, 1922, in a fifteen-round unanimous decision at Madison Square Garden. Leonard had a more difficult time with the fight than in their previous meeting, as Kansas was the aggressor throughout the match, and Leonard had trouble when fighting at close quarters. The tide turned in the ninth round, when Kansas, fighting against the ropes, let his guard down and Leonard, with characteristic lightning speed shot a smashing left that sent his opponent down for the count of nine. Somehow, Kansas recovered, and after arising managed to defend Leonard's considerable efforts to end the match. Feeling more confident against a weakened opponent, Leonard bored in for the rest of the bout, taking the lead. Winning the eleventh through the fifteenth, Leonard built up a significant enough point's margin to win the match. By the fifteenth, Leonard was trying for a knockout, but to his credit, after the ninth, Kansas remained on his feet though badly battered in the remaining rounds.

On May 19, 1922, Leonard defeated Hungarian born Jewish boxer Soldier Bartfield, originally Jacob Bartfedlt, in a four-round points decision at Madison Square Garden. Bartfield had an incredible career, fighting 55 world title claimants in his 220 recorded fights. As was Leonard's strength, he defeated Bartfield with a variety of moves, including blows to the head and body using both lefts and rights, and built a solid points margin. Leonard seriously affected Bartfield with an uppercut to the chin in the fourth round, one of his most telling and lightning fast blows. The match was a charity event for the Sports Alliance, and Jack Dempsey was introduced. In three previous meetings in 1919, Leonard had gained significant margins against Bartfield in matches in the Northeast.

== Welter championship attempt, June, 1922 ==
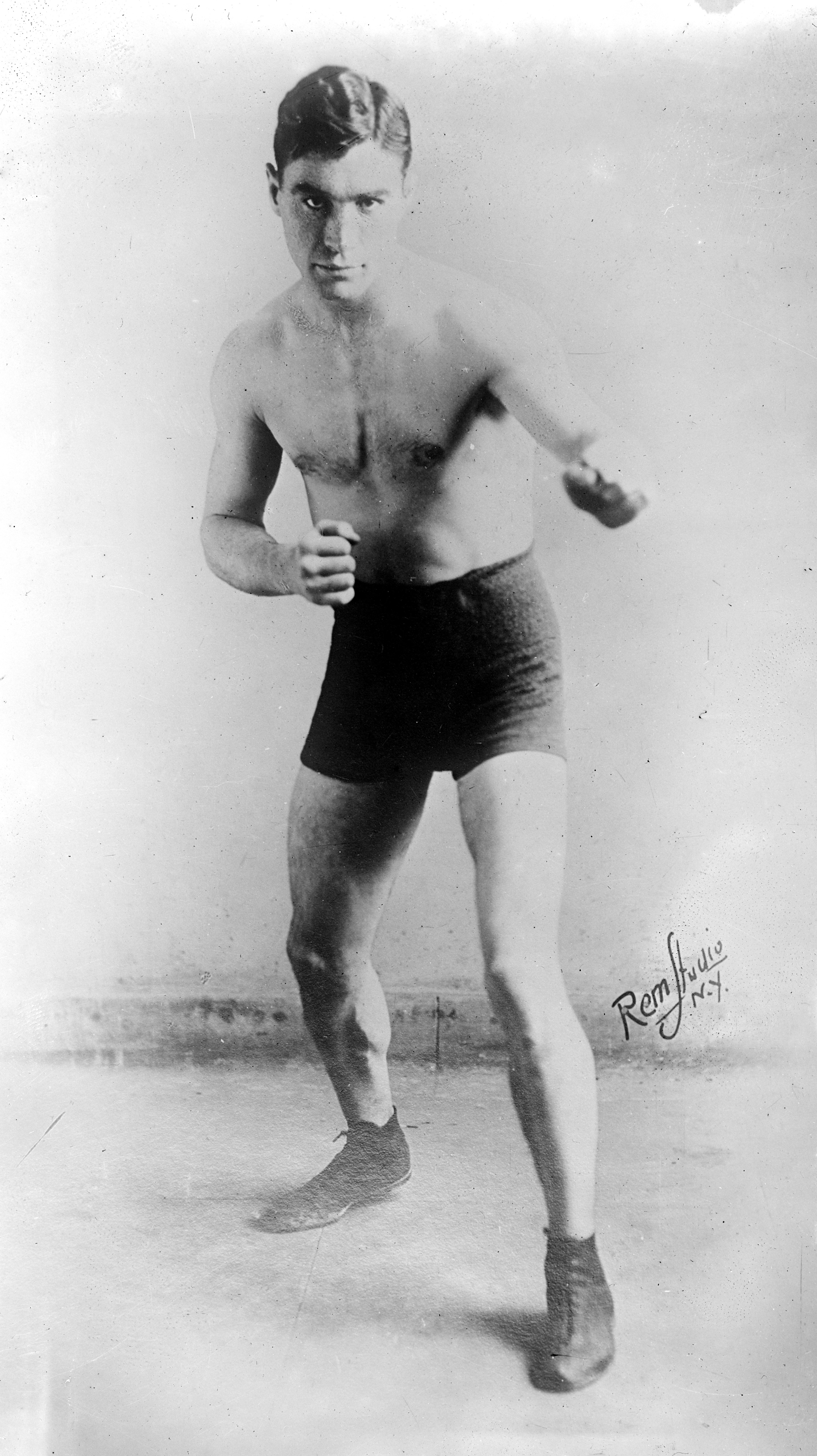
Welterweight Jack Britton

Moving up a weight class from the world lightweight championship which he already held, Leonard challenged welterweight Champion Jack Britton for his title on June 26, 1922. He lost the fight when he was disqualified for hitting Britton when he was down in the thirteenth round. A few in the audience, including news reporter Ernest Hemingway, likely suspected the possibility of a fix, as there were rumors that a Jewish underworld figure, Arnold Rothstein, had influence over Leonard, and that Leonard had been pressured to lose the fight. In a somewhat anti-semitic twist, Hemingway later penned a short story, Fifty Grand, in 1927, about a corrupt boxing manager who fixes a fight to profit from the outcome with the aid of gangsters and gamblers. The original version of the story mentioned Leonard by name, before being edited out by F. Scott Fitzgerald before publication.

=== Bouts with lightweight Lew Tendler, 1922-3 ===
On July 27, 1922, Leonard defeated fellow Jewish boxer Lew Tendler in a twelve-round newspaper decision in Jersey City in a lightweight world title match, that may have been the most remarkable bout of his career. Before a record audience of 70,000 enthralled fans, Leonard won five rounds, Tendler four, with three even. Tendler may have led in the first five rounds, as Leonard could not adjust to or penetrate his unique Southpaw stance, style, and defense. In the eighth, Tendler crashed a terrific left to his opponent, but Leonard distracted him by mumbling a few words, and then going to a clinch to slow Tendler down. Tendler never delivered the follow-up knockout blow, and Leonard, getting time to recover, dominated the next seven rounds. In their last meeting on July 24, 1923, Leonard won a unanimous fifteen-round decision at Yankee Stadium before an extraordinary crowd of 58,000. The bout took place in the Bronx in another lightweight world title match. Leonard excelled in the speed and precision of his attack, while still managing to ward off most of his opponents blows, particularly Tendler's strong left. Leonard demonstrated his mastery of ring tactics against an opponent who became sluggish, and was unable to mount the offensive he had shown in their bout the previous July. By one account, Leonard managed to land three blows for every one of Tendler's, demonstrating his speed and mastery of tactics. With the huge crowd, Leonard's take home pay exceeded $130,000, an extraordinary sum for the era.

=== Bout with light welter champ, Pinky Mitchell, 1923 ===
Leonard defeated Pinky Mitchell on May 29, 1923, in a ten-round technical knockout in Chicago. Mitchell was the reigning world light welterweight champion from 1922 to 1926, and Leonard's win signaled another victory against a world champion, though the fight was not a title fight. As Leonard refused to weigh in, neither world lightweight or world junior welterweight titles were at stake. After a slow first five rounds with few blows, Leonard took the lead in the remaining rounds with the exception of the eighth and ninth. In the eight, Mitchell scored with four rights to the chin of Leonard. Though both boxers scored points, Leonard seemed to have the edge from the fifth. In the tenth, Leonard dropped Pinky to the mat, and upon arising, he knocked him to the mat a second time. The referee called an end to the match, resulting in a technical knockout. Immediately afterwards, Pinkie's brother Ritchie believed a foul had been committed, claiming Leonard had hit Pinky when he was down on one knee on the mat, but the referee disagreed. The Buffalo Courier wrote that Leonard was in the motions of hitting Pinky when he was on one knee, but that the referee waved him away before the blow occurred. Regardless, a fight between Richie and Davey Mitchell, the referee, ensued that ended in a near riot among the spectators. The police put down the protests with their billy clubs, though no arrests were made. Despite the protests, the charity event ended with a win by Leonard and no foul called by the referee against Mitchell in the tenth.

Leonard soundly defeated Andy Hart on July 9, 1923, before a record crowd near 30,000, in a resounding newspaper win at Shibe Park in Philadelphia. In the third, Leonard delivered many straight jabs which were unreturned, and his hard rights to Hart's ribs in the fourth, forced his opponent to hold. In the sixth, Leonard stung Hart with blows to the jaw and chest, which appeared to sap Hart's strength, but he persevered. Though Leonard showed speed and aggression throughout the bout, several reporters felt he took it easy on Hart, lacking the characteristic snap to his punches, until the seventh and eighth when he gained a more comfortable points margin and came closest to putting Hart on the canvas. His nine months off making theater performances, may have reduced his strength or speed, but it certainly failed to decrease his boxing technique enough to lose the match.

Leonard defeated Johnny Mendelsohn On September 7, 1923, in an eight-round newspaper decision in Philadelphia. In the seventh and eighth, Leonard showed complete dominance of his opponent. Nonetheless, at points in the bout, Mendelsohn delivered a few left hooks and right swings, that landed well on Leonard and showed he was not facing a novice. The Associated Press gave Leonard an impressive seven of the eight rounds, as Mendelsohn connected with strong blows infrequently and failed to hurt his opponent in the vast majority of the bout. The match demonstrated Leonard's versatility in his ability to dominate an opponent without taking the offensive, and proved again the effectiveness of his defense. Though Mendelsohn faced some top lightweight talent throughout his career, his record by 1923 was well on the wane, and he was not one of Leonard's best opponents.

== Retirement and comeback ==
Leonard announced his retirement from boxing on January 15, 1925, as the reigning World Lightweight Champion partly because his mother wanted him to leave boxing due to her failing health. He lost most of his considerable fortune from real estate investments, boxing, and his work as an actor, in the stock market crash of 1929. As a result, between 1931 and 1932, he made an ill-advised comeback, defeating a total of 19 handpicked opponents who were unlikely to end his comeback hopes. In a second-round technical knockout in Queens, New York on October 6, 1931, he won against Pal Silvers, an opponent who would have been vastly inferior to Leonard in his prime. The "dive" taken by Silvers in the second made many in the audience question the authenticity of the bout, while many horrified fans witnessed Leonard, the formerly flawless tactician, taking continuous blows to his face before the end of the bout. Although described as pudgy and slow, the balding Leonard won 23 total fights in his comeback, albeit against nondescript opposition. Leonard hoped eventually he would have a big payday with a top rated opponent.

=== Marty Goldman, May 1932 ===
Boxing as a welterweight on May 16, 1932, Leonard won a knockout only 45 seconds into the second round from Jewish boxer Marty Goldman, another product of New York's Lower East Side. The bout was fought at Laurel Gardens in Newark, New Jersey. Leonard's final blow was a short but powerful right to the jaw, which was preceded by a brief flurry of jabs. To many fans, Leonard's footwork and use of rapid combination punching brought back images of the Leonard of old, but in reality Goldman, though a solid club fighter, was far from a world ranked welterweight contender.

=== Andy Saviola, June 1932 ===
Leonard, boxing as a welterweight, defeated Andy Saviola on June 8, 1932, in an easy ten-round points decision at Brooklyn's Coney Island. Leonard sustained cuts to both his eyes, but fought with great technique throughout the bout and had Saviola on the verge of a knockout by the final round. In the sixth, Saviola had no defense nor counter punches for Leonard's punishing lefts and rights to the body. Both boxers remained on their feet throughout the bout.

On June 16, 1932, Leonard defeated Billy Angelo, before a crowd of around 10,000 at the Baker Bowl in Philadelphia. His best round was the tenth, in which he landed repeated rights and totally dominated his opponent. Leonard was down in his weight, and had likely trained hard for the bout.

=== Eddie Shapiro, July 1932 ===
On the comeback trail as a 153-pound welterweight, on July 22, 1932, Leonard defeated Eddie Shapiro at Coney Island in an eight-round points decision of which the United Press wrote "Benny Leonard completely outboxed Sharpiro, pounding him at will". In reality, the first four rounds were slow and Shapiro was warned three times in the first two rounds by the referee to speed up the pace and land more blows. Before a modest crowd of around 6,000, in a strong rain, Leonard won decisively in the later rounds, disposing of Shapiro handily. In the fourth, Leonard nearly flattened Shapiro, asserting his dominance. Shapiro, however, was far from a lightweight contender and his record after the Leonard fight was quite poor.

Leonard defeated Billy Townsend on July 28, 1932, at Queensboro Stadium in Long Island in a ten-round points decision before a sizable crowd of 6000. Leonard attacked Townsend with left hand jabs and strong right hand smashes that staggered Townsend in several rounds and pushed the judges to a unanimous decision. Townsend, however, staggered Leonard in the fourth. Benny's knees dropped, but he clutched Townsend around the waist, whispered into his ear, and clutched long enough to recover. Leonard completed the bout well ahead on points, despite a closer tenth round. One reporter gave Leonard all but the fourth and tenth rounds, but Leonard took more punishment than he would have in his earlier days from his competent, but not championship quality opponent.

On August 11, 1932, Leonard defeated Paulie Walker in a well publicized ten round bout at Ebbetts Field in Brooklyn. Walker was nearly knocked out two minutes into the tenth round.

=== Final bout, loss to Jimmy McLarnin ===
Leonard found his payday on October 7, 1932, but it ended his career when he was knocked out after 6 rounds by future champion, Irish-Canadian boxer Jimmy McLarnin. Madison Garden was packed near capacity with 19,000 excited fans to see the fight. Only two minutes into the first round, Leonard connected with a right to McLarnin's chin, and his knees brushed the canvas for an instant. The huge crowd was in a frenzy. Clinching, and retreating, the younger and fitter McLarnin managed to recover from the blow, and by the end of the round had taken charge. McLarnin dropped Leonard in the second, and only his great defensive skills allowed him to stay in the contest through the next four rounds while he received continual punishment. In the sixth, Leonard was dazed by a series of punches from the exceptionally skilled McLarnin, and the referee mercifully halted the fight to save Leonard from further punishment. The defeat was seen as humiliating by many of Leonard's supporters, particularly his Jewish fans, but a loss to one of the greatest boxers of the century, a future triple weight class champion. After the loss, the New York World Telegram wrote, "The real Leonard already is immortal, the artist of the ring canvas who glided up and back, the genius of punch slipping, the counter-puncher of lightning reflex snap, the lion-hearted campaigner, and the devoted believer of all that's good in boxing".

The $15,000 Leonard received from the bout helped to ease his financial burden, and he married his secretary, Jacqueline Stern the following year. He was later married to Emogene Carlson.

== Military service ==
Leonard was commissioned as a lieutenant in the United States Army during World War I. Initially stationed at Camp Upton in Yaphank, Long Island, he served as a boxing instructor for soldiers in training.

On October 23, 1942, Leonard enrolled in the United States Maritime Service and was assigned as welfare director at the Hoffman Island training station in New York City, where he supervised boxing instruction and physical training for apprentice seamen. He also spoke at bond rallies and other war-effort functions throughout the country. Leonard was later stationed at the Sheepshead Bay Maritime Service Training Station in Brooklyn, where he served as director of recreation and morale and was promoted to lieutenant commander by the end of World War II.

== Life outside boxing ==
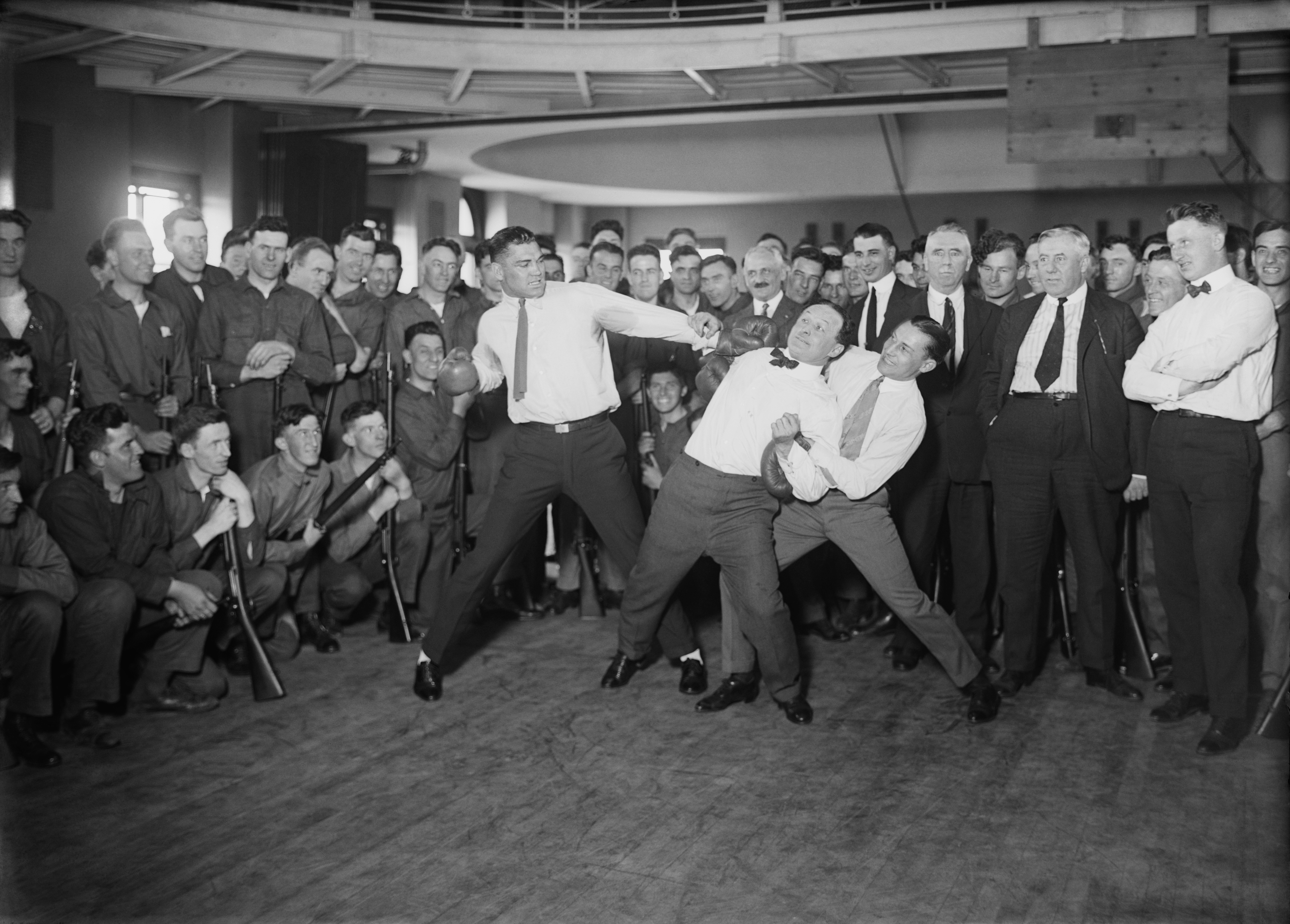
Leonard holding back Harry Houdini, mock punched by heavyweight champion Jack Dempsey

Leonard worked as a front man for National Hockey League owner Bill Dwyer of the New York Americans, who had secretly purchased the Pittsburgh Pirates of that league. Leonard was supposed to appear as if he owned the team. The team suffered both at the gate and on the ice, moved to Philadelphia for 1930–31 and then folded.

Prior to the stock market crash of 1929, he invested in a car accessory business in Harlem, bought a block of flats in Jersey City and had a share in a dress-making business.

Also, sometime during his career, Leonard advertised Harley Davidson motorcycles on press ads.

=== Film and acting career ===
Leonard worked as an after dinner speaker and lecturer after leaving boxing in 1925. With his good looks and the crowd his fame could bring, he performed in vaudeville, making several appearances as a dancer and performer shortly after his first boxing retirement. He appeared in the vaudeville musical Battling Butler in 1927.

During his boxing career Leonard starred in the film serial The Evil Eye (1920) and a series of boxing related film shorts titled Flying Fists (1924–1925). He also appeared in The Come-Back (1925), and Hitting Hard (1925).

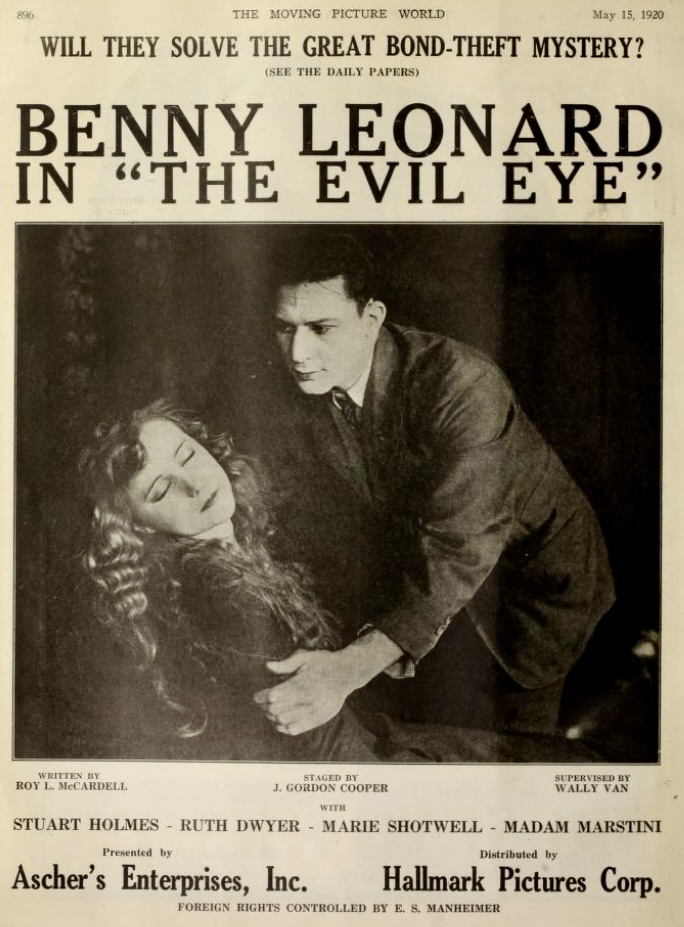
Trade ad for The Evil Eye (1920) starring Benny Leonard

Leonard lost the vast majority of his fortune in the stock market crash of 1929.

After his failed boxing comeback attempt, from 1933 to 1934 he worked as a boxing instructor for the physical education department at City College of New York, a school with a large Jewish enrollment.

When the United States entered World War II, he enlisted in the Maritime Service and took charge of the physical training of 100,000 men, eventually rising to the rank of Lieutenant Commander by the time he had completed his three years of service.

=== Final work as a referee and death ===
In 1943, Leonard worked as a boxing referee and continued in that endeavor after the war, with the majority of his bouts in New York and Philadelphia. After refereeing the first six bouts of the April 18, 1947, card at the St. Nicholas Arena in New York, Leonard was stricken with a massive heart attack during the first round of the next bout, between Mario Ramon and Bobby Williams. He toppled to the canvas, and died in the ring. The ringside physician, Dr. Vicent Nardiello, attempted to revive him unsuccessfully. He was only 51 years old. Leonard was interred at Mount Carmel Cemetery in Glendale, New York. A majority of Jewish boxing historians still consider him the greatest Jewish boxer of the twentieth century for his astounding record of wins during his long reign as lightweight champion. (1896–1947)

== Professional boxing record ==
All information in this section is derived from BoxRec, unless otherwise stated.

=== Official record ===
219 fights	89 wins	6 losses
By knockout	70	5
By decision	17	0
By disqualification	2	1
Draws	1	
No contests	3	
Newspaper decisions/draws	120	

All newspaper decisions are officially regarded as "no decision" bouts and are not counted in the win/loss/draw column.

No.	Result	Record	Opponent	Type	Round	Date	Age	Location	Notes
219	Loss	89–6–1 (123)	Jimmy McLarnin	TKO	6 (10)	Oct 7, 1932	36 years, 183 days	Madison Square Garden, New York City, New York, U.S.	
218	Win	89–5–1 (123)	Mike Sarko	PTS	6	Sep 12, 1932	36 years, 158 days	Starlight Park, New York City, New York, U.S.	
217	Win	88–5–1 (123)	Jimmy Abbott	TKO	3 (10)	Sep 8, 1932	36 years, 154 days	Fort Hamilton Arena, New York City, New York, U.S.	
216	Win	87–5–1 (123)	Phil Rafferty	PTS	6	Sep 2, 1932	36 years, 148 days	Long Beach Stadium, Long Beach, New York, U.S.	
215	Win	86–5–1 (123)	Mike Sarko	PTS	6	Aug 19, 1932	36 years, 134 days	Long Beach Stadium, Long Beach, New York, U.S.	
214	Win	85–5–1 (123)	Paulie Walker	UD	10	Aug 11, 1932	36 years, 126 days	Ebbets Field, New York City, New York, U.S.	
213	Win	84–5–1 (123)	Billy Townsend	PTS	10	Jul 28, 1932	36 years, 112 days	Queensboro Stadium, New York City, New York, U.S.	
212	Win	83–5–1 (123)	Eddie Shapiro	PTS	8	Jul 22, 1932	36 years, 106 days	Coney Island Stadium, New York City, New York, U.S.	
211	Win	82–5–1 (123)	Joe Trippe	KO	2 (10)	Jun 20, 1932	36 years, 74 days	Bonacker's Stadium, Rensselaer, New York, U.S.	
210	Win	81–5–1 (123)	Billy Angelo	PTS	10	Jun 16, 1932	36 years, 70 days	Baker Bowl, Philadelphia, Pennsylvania, U.S.	
209	Win	80–5–1 (123)	Andy Saviola	PTS	10	Jun 8, 1932	36 years, 62 days	Coney Island Stadium, New York City, New York, U.S.	
208	Win	79–5–1 (123)	Jimmy Abbott	TKO	6 (10)	May 23, 1932	36 years, 46 days	Paterson, New Jersey, U.S.	
207	Win	78–5–1 (123)	Marty Goldman	KO	2 (10)	May 16, 1932	36 years, 39 days	Laurel Garden, Newark, New Jersey, U.S.	
206	Win	77–5–1 (123)	Willie Garafola	TKO	4 (10)	May 2, 1932	36 years, 25 days	St. Nicholas Arena, New York City, New York, U.S.	
205	Win	76–5–1 (123)	Mike Sarko	PTS	6	Apr 19, 1932	36 years, 12 days	Ridgewood Grove, New York City, New York, U.S.	
204	Win	75–5–1 (123)	Buster Brown	PTS	10	Apr 11, 1932	36 years, 4 days	St. Nicholas Arena, New York City, New York, U.S.	
203	Win	74–5–1 (123)	Billy McMahon	PTS	10	Feb 29, 1932	35 years, 328 days	St. Nicholas Arena, New York City, New York, U.S.	
202	Win	73–5–1 (123)	Buster Brown	PTS	10	Nov 23, 1931	35 years, 230 days	Carlin's Park, Baltimore, Maryland, U.S.	
201	Draw	72–5–1 (123)	Johnny Kasper	PTS	10	Nov 6, 1931	35 years, 213 days	Memorial Auditorium, Burlington, Vermont, U.S.	
200	Win	72–5 (123)	Vittorio Livan	KO	3 (10)	Oct 27, 1931	35 years, 203 days	Arena, Boston, Massachusetts, U.S.	
199	Win	71–5 (123)	Pal Silvers	TKO	2 (10)	Oct 6, 1931	35 years, 182 days	Queensboro Stadium, New York City, New York, U.S.	
198	Win	70–5 (123)	Pal Moran	NWS	10	Aug 11, 1924	28 years, 126 days	Olympic Arena, New York City, New York, U.S.	
197	Win	70–5 (122)	Johnny Mendelsohn	NWS	8	Sep 7, 1923	27 years, 153 days	Shibe Park, Philadelphia, Pennsylvania, U.S.	
196	Win	70–5 (121)	Lew Tendler	UD	15	Jul 24, 1923	27 years, 108 days	Yankee Stadium, New York City, New York, U.S.	Retained NYSAC and NBA lightweight titles
195	Win	69–5 (121)	Alex Hart	NWS	8	Jul 9, 1923	27 years, 93 days	Shibe Park, Philadelphia, Pennsylvania, U.S.	
194	Win	69–5 (120)	Pinky Mitchell	TKO	10 (10)	May 29, 1923	27 years, 52 days	Dexter Park Pavilion, Chicago, Illinois, U.S.	
193	Win	68–5 (120)	Ever Hammer	NWS	10	Aug 5, 1922	26 years, 120 days	Sky Blue Arena, Michigan City, Indiana, U.S.	
192	Win	68–5 (119)	Lew Tendler	NWS	12	Jul 27, 1922	26 years, 111 days	Boyle's Thirty Acres, Jersey City, New Jersey, U.S.	NYSAC and NBA lightweight titles at stake; (via KO only)
191	Win	68–5 (118)	Rocky Kansas	TKO	8 (10)	Jul 4, 1922	26 years, 88 days	Sky Blue Arena, Michigan City, Indiana, U.S.	
190	Loss	67–5 (118)	Jack Britton	DQ	13 (15)	Jun 26, 1922	26 years, 80 days	Velodrome, New York City, New York, U.S.	For NYSAC and NBA welterweight titles
189	Win	67–4 (118)	Jakob "Soldier" Bartfield	PTS	4	Apr 19, 1922	26 years, 12 days	Madison Square Garden, New York City, New York, U.S.	
188	Win	66–4 (118)	Johnny Clinton	NWS	10	Mar 20, 1922	25 years, 347 days	Arena, Boston, Massachusetts, U.S.	
187	Win	66–4 (117)	Pal Moran	NWS	10	Feb 25, 1922	25 years, 324 days	Louisiana Auditorium, New Orleans, Louisiana, U.S.	
186	Win	66–4 (116)	Rocky Kansas	UD	15	Feb 10, 1922	25 years, 309 days	Madison Square Garden, New York City, New York, U.S.	Retained NYSAC and NBA lightweight titles
185	Win	65–4 (116)	Tim Droney	NWS	8	Dec 20, 1921	25 years, 257 days	Ice Palace, Philadelphia, Pennsylvania, U.S.	
184	Win	65–4 (115)	Sailor Friedman	NWS	8	Nov 22, 1921	25 years, 229 days	Ice Palace, Philadelphia, Pennsylvania, U.S.	
183	Win	65–4 (114)	Rocky Kansas	NWS	12	Jun 6, 1921	25 years, 60 days	Federal League Baseball Park, Harrison, New Jersey, U.S.	NYSAC and NBA lightweight titles at stake; (via KO only)
182	Win	65–4 (113)	Joe Welling	NWS	8	Feb 24, 1921	24 years, 323 days	Coliseum, Saint Louis, Missouri, U.S.	
181	Win	65–4 (112)	Eddie Moy	TKO	3 (10)	Feb 21, 1921	24 years, 320 days	Madison Square Garden, New York City, New York, U.S.	
180	Win	64–4 (112)	Richie Mitchell	TKO	6 (15)	Jan 14, 1921	24 years, 282 days	Madison Square Garden, New York City, New York, U.S.	Retained NYSAC and NBA lightweight titles
179	Win	63–4 (112)	Joe Welling	TKO	14 (15)	Nov 26, 1920	24 years, 233 days	Madison Square Garden, New York City, New York, U.S.	Retained NYSAC lightweight title
178	Win	62–4 (112)	Harlem Eddie Kelly	DQ	5 (12)	Nov 17, 1920	24 years, 224 days	Commonwealth Sporting Club, New York City, New York, U.S.	
177	Win	61–4 (112)	K.O. Willie Loughlin	NWS	10	Nov 12, 1920	24 years, 219 days	Third Regiment Armory, Camden, New Jersey, U.S.	
176	Win	61–4 (111)	Johnny Tillman	PTS	10	Oct 18, 1920	24 years, 194 days	Armory, Akron, Ohio, U.S.	
175	Win	60–4 (111)	Johnny Sheppard	TKO	3 (10)	Oct 8, 1920	24 years, 184 days	6th Regiment Armory, Paterson, New Jersey, U.S.	
174	Win	59–4 (111)	Frankie Britt	TKO	5 (10)	Oct 4, 1920	24 years, 180 days	Wethersfield Baseball Grounds, Hartford, Connecticut, U.S.	
173	Win	58–4 (111)	Pal Moran	NWS	10	Sep 25, 1920	24 years, 171 days	East Chicago, Illinois, U.S.	
172	Win	58–4 (110)	K.O. Willie Loughlin	KO	9 (10)	Sep 10, 1920	24 years, 156 days	Armory, Camden, New Jersey, U.S.	
171	Win	57–4 (110)	Charley White	KO	9 (10)	Jul 5, 1920	24 years, 89 days	Floyd Fitzsimmons Arena, Benton Harbor, Michigan, U.S.	
170	Win	56–4 (110)	Johnny Dundee	NWS	8	Feb 9, 1920	23 years, 308 days	4th Regiment Armory, Jersey City, New Jersey, U.S.	
169	Win	56–4 (109)	Jake Abel	NWS	10	Dec 22, 1919	23 years, 259 days	Auditorium, Atlanta, Georgia, U.S.	
168	Win	56–4 (108)	James Red Herring	TKO	6 (8)	Dec 19, 1919	23 years, 256 days	Southern A.C., Memphis, Tennessee, U.S.	
167	Win	55–4 (108)	Mel Coogan	TKO	2 (8)	Dec 10, 1919	23 years, 247 days	4th Regiment Armory, Jersey City, New Jersey, U.S.	
166	Win	54–4 (108)	Jakob "Soldier" Bartfield	NWS	6	Nov 27, 1919	23 years, 234 days	Olympia A.C., Philadelphia, Pennsylvania, U.S.	
165	Win	54–4 (107)	Lockport Jimmy Duffy	TKO	2 (15)	Nov 17, 1919	23 years, 224 days	Convention Hall, Tulsa, Oklahoma, U.S.	Retained world lightweight title
164	Win	53–4 (107)	Jakob "Soldier" Bartfield	NWS	8	Nov 10, 1919	23 years, 217 days	4th Regiment Armory, Jersey City, New Jersey, U.S.	
163	Win	53–4 (106)	Phil Bloom	NWS	10	Oct 15, 1919	23 years, 191 days	Arena Gardens, Detroit, Michigan, U.S.	
162	Win	53–4 (105)	Charley Metrie	TKO	7 (10)	Oct 1, 1919	23 years, 177 days	Arena Gardens, Detroit, Michigan, U.S.	
161	Win	52–4 (105)	Johnny Dundee	NWS	8	Sep 17, 1919	23 years, 163 days	1st Regiment Armory, Newark, New Jersey, U.S.	
160	Win	52–4 (104)	Johnny Clinton	NWS	10	Sep 8, 1919	23 years, 154 days	Arena, Syracuse, New York, U.S.	
159	Win	52–4 (103)	Jakob "Soldier" Bartfield	NWS	6	Sep 4, 1919	23 years, 150 days	Shibe Park, Philadelphia, Pennsylvania, U.S.	
158	Win	52–4 (102)	Patsy Cline	NWS	6	Aug 11, 1919	23 years, 126 days	Shibe Park, Philadelphia, Pennsylvania, U.S.	
157	Win	52–4 (101)	Joe Malone	TKO	3 (6)	Jul 23, 1919	23 years, 107 days	Newport, Rhode Island, U.S.	
156	Win	51–4 (101)	Johnny Dundee	NWS	6	Jun 16, 1919	23 years, 70 days	Shibe Park, Philadelphia, Pennsylvania, U.S.	
155	Win	51–4 (100)	Charley Pitts	NWS	10	Jun 9, 1919	23 years, 63 days	Theatre francais, Montreal, Quebec, Canada	
154	Win	51–4 (99)	Young George Erne	KO	6 (8)	May 21, 1919	23 years, 44 days	Grand Theater, Trenton, New Jersey, U.S.	
153	Win	50–4 (99)	Willie Ritchie	TKO	8 (8)	Apr 28, 1919	23 years, 21 days	1st Regiment Armory, Newark, New Jersey, U.S.	
152	Win	49–4 (99)	Harvey Thorpe	NWS	10	Mar 26, 1919	22 years, 353 days	Joplin, Missouri, U.S.	
151	Loss	49–4 (98)	Willie Ritchie	NWS	4	Feb 21, 1919	22 years, 320 days	Civic Auditorium, San Francisco, California, U.S.	
150	Win	49–4 (97)	Wildcat Leonard	KO	4 (4)	Feb 7, 1919	22 years, 306 days	Hoffman A.C., Sacramento, California, U.S.	
149	Win	48–4 (97)	Spider Roach	NWS	4	Feb 5, 1919	22 years, 304 days	Auditorium, Oakland, California, U.S.	
148	Win	48–4 (96)	Joe Benjamin	NWS	4	Jan 31, 1919	22 years, 299 days	Civic Auditorium, San Francisco, California, U.S.	
147	Win	48–4 (95)	Johnny Dundee	NWS	8	Jan 20, 1919	22 years, 288 days	1st Regiment Armory, Newark, New Jersey, U.S.	
146	Win	48–4 (94)	Harlem Eddie Kelly	NWS	6	Jan 13, 1919	22 years, 281 days	Olympia A.C., Philadelphia, Pennsylvania, U.S.	
145	Win	48–4 (93)	Paul Doyle	NWS	6	Jan 1, 1919	22 years, 269 days	Olympia A.C., Philadelphia, Pennsylvania, U.S.	
144	Draw	48–4 (92)	Ted Kid Lewis	NWS	8	Sep 23, 1918	22 years, 169 days	Weidenmeyer's Park, Newark, New Jersey, U.S.	World welterweight title at stake; (via KO only)
143	Win	48–4 (91)	Harry Pierce	NWS	6	Sep 16, 1918	22 years, 162 days	Olympia A.C., Philadelphia, Pennsylvania, U.S.	
142	Win	48–4 (90)	Willie Gradwell	TKO	5 (8)	Jul 22, 1918	22 years, 106 days	4th Regiment Armory, Jersey City, New Jersey, U.S.	
141	Win	47–4 (90)	Willie Jackson	NWS	6	Jul 16, 1918	22 years, 100 days	Madison Square Garden, New York City, New York, U.S.	
140	Win	47–4 (89)	Jack Brazzo	TKO	8 (8)	Jul 4, 1918	22 years, 88 days	Wildwood Beach Baseball Park, Wildwood, New Jersey, U.S.	
139	Win	46–4 (89)	Jack Britton	NWS	6	Jun 25, 1918	22 years, 79 days	Shibe Park, Philadelphia, Pennsylvania, U.S.	
138	Win	46–4 (88)	Barney Adair	NWS	4	Jun 6, 1918	22 years, 60 days	Broadway Auditorium, Buffalo, New York, U.S.	
137	Win	46–4 (87)	Mike Golindo	PTS	4	May 25, 1918	22 years, 48 days	City Stadium, San Diego, California, U.S.	
136	Win	45–4 (87)	Louis ReesMcCarthy	NWS	4	May 20, 1918	22 years, 43 days	Shrine Temple, Los Angeles, California, U.S.	
135	Win	45–4 (86)	Johnny McCarthy	NWS	4	May 10, 1918	22 years, 33 days	Civic Auditorium, San Francisco, California, U.S.	
134	Win	45–4 (85)	Jack Brazzo	TKO	4 (6)	Apr 13, 1918	22 years, 6 days	National A.C., Philadelphia, Pennsylvania, U.S.	
133	Win	44–4 (85)	Young Joe Borrell	NWS	6	Apr 8, 1918	22 years, 1 day	Olympia A.C., Philadelphia, Pennsylvania, U.S.	
132	Win	44–4 (84)	Freddie Kelly	NWS	6	Dec 19, 1917	21 years, 256 days	National A.C., Philadelphia, Pennsylvania, U.S.	
131	Win	44–4 (83)	Chick Brown	TKO	5 (10)	Dec 17, 1917	21 years, 254 days	Arena, New Haven, Connecticut, U.S.	
130	Win	43–4 (83)	Patsy Cline	NWS	6	Dec 12, 1917	21 years, 249 days	Olympia A.C., Philadelphia, Pennsylvania, U.S.	
129	Win	43–4 (82)	Gene Delmont	KO	8 (10)	Dec 5, 1917	21 years, 242 days	Auditorium, Saint Paul, Minnesota, U.S.	
128	Win	42–4 (82)	Battling Sailor Frank Kirk	KO	1 (10)	Nov 28, 1917	21 years, 235 days	Stockyards Stadium, Denver, Colorado, U.S.	
127	Win	41–4 (82)	Toughy Ramser	KO	7 (10)	Oct 24, 1917	21 years, 199 days	Cleveland A.C., Cleveland, Ohio, U.S.	
126	Win	40–4 (82)	Young George Erne	NWS	6	Oct 23, 1917	21 years, 199 days	Broadway Auditorium, Buffalo, New York, U.S.	
125	Win	40–4 (81)	Young Eddie Wagond	NWS	6	Oct 22, 1917	21 years, 198 days	Olympia A.C., Philadelphia, Pennsylvania, U.S.	
124	Win	40–4 (80)	Jack Britton	NWS	10	Oct 19, 1917	21 years, 195 days	Harlem S.C., New York City, New York, U.S.	
123	Win	40–4 (79)	Vic Moran	KO	2 (10)	Oct 5, 1917	21 years, 181 days	Harlem S.C., New York City, New York, U.S.	
122	Win	39–4 (79)	Eddie Dorsey	KO	2 (10)	Sep 27, 1917	21 years, 173 days	Broadway Auditorium, Buffalo, New York, U.S.	
121	Win	38–4 (79)	Leo Johnson	TKO	1 (10)	Sep 21, 1917	21 years, 167 days	Harlem S.C., New York City, New York, U.S.	Retained world lightweight title
120	Win	37–4 (79)	Phil Bloom	KO	2 (10)	Sep 14, 1917	21 years, 160 days	Forbes Field, Pittsburgh, Pennsylvania, U.S.	
119	Win	36–4 (79)	Jimmy Paul	NWS	6	Sep 12, 1917	21 years, 158 days	Fairmont A.C., New York City, New York, U.S.	
118	Win	36–4 (78)	Young Rector	TKO	5 (10)	Sep 3, 1917	21 years, 149 days	Island Stadium, Toronto, Ontario, Canada	
117	Win	35–4 (78)	Johnny Kilbane	TKO	3 (6)	Jul 25, 1917	21 years, 109 days	Shibe Park, Philadelphia, Pennsylvania, U.S.	
116	Win	34–4 (78)	Johnny Nelson	TKO	3 (10)	Jun 18, 1917	21 years, 72 days	Harlem S.C., New York City, New York, U.S.	
115	Win	33–4 (78)	Joe Welsh	NWS	6	Jun 4, 1917	21 years, 58 days	Olympia A.C., Philadelphia, Pennsylvania, U.S.	
114	Win	33–4 (77)	Freddie Welsh	TKO	9 (10)	May 28, 1917	21 years, 51 days	Manhattan Casino, New York City, New York, U.S.	Won world lightweight title
113	Win	32–4 (77)	Eddie Shannon	TKO	6 (10)	May 10, 1917	21 years, 33 days	Clermont Avenue Rink, New York City, New York, U.S.	
112	Win	31–4 (77)	Charley Thomas	TKO	6 (6)	May 7, 1917	21 years, 30 days	Olympia A.C., Philadelphia, Pennsylvania, U.S.	
111	Win	30–4 (77)	Richie Mitchell	TKO	7 (10)	Apr 19, 1917	21 years, 12 days	Auditorium, Milwaukee, Wisconsin, U.S.	
110	Win	29–4 (77)	Packy Hommey	KO	9 (10)	Mar 22, 1917	20 years, 349 days	Fairmont A.C., New York City, New York, U.S.	
109	Win	28–4 (77)	Johnny Tillman	NWS	6	Mar 12, 1917	20 years, 339 days	Olympia A.C., Philadelphia, Pennsylvania, U.S.	
108	Win	28–4 (76)	Jimmy Reagan	NWS	10	Feb 28, 1917	20 years, 327 days	Manhattan Casino, New York City, New York, U.S.	
107	Win	28–4 (75)	Frankie Callahan	NWS	10	Feb 1, 1917	20 years, 300 days	Clermont Avenue Rink, New York City, New York, U.S.	
106	Win	28–4 (74)	Phil Bloom	NWS	10	Jan 30, 1917	20 years, 298 days	Broadway S.C., New York City, New York, U.S.	
105	Win	28–4 (73)	Eddie Wallace	NWS	6	Jan 22, 1917	20 years, 290 days	Olympia A.C., Philadelphia, Pennsylvania, U.S.	
104	Win	28–4 (72)	Chick Simler	NWS	10	Nov 28, 1916	20 years, 235 days	Empire A.C., Harlem, New York City, New York, U.S.	
103	Win	28–4 (71)	Harvey Thorpe	KO	12 (12)	Nov 21, 1916	20 years, 228 days	Coliseum, Saint Louis, Missouri, U.S.	
102	Loss	27–4 (71)	Johnny Dundee	NWS	6	Nov 15, 1916	20 years, 222 days	Olympia A.C., Philadelphia, Pennsylvania, U.S.	
101	Win	27–4 (70)	Stanley Yoakum	NWS	10	Nov 10, 1916	20 years, 217 days	Harlem S.C., New York City, New York, U.S.	
100	Win	27–4 (69)	Ever Hammer	TKO	12 (15)	Oct 18, 1916	20 years, 194 days	Convention Hall, Kansas City, Missouri, U.S.	
99	Win	26–4 (69)	Johnny Nelson	NWS	6	Oct 9, 1916	20 years, 185 days	Olympia A.C., Philadelphia, Pennsylvania, U.S.	
98	Win	26–4 (68)	Johnny Tillman	NWS	6	Sep 25, 1916	20 years, 171 days	Olympia A.C., Philadelphia, Pennsylvania, U.S.	
97	Win	26–4 (67)	Frankie Conifrey	TKO	7 (10)	Sep 14, 1916	20 years, 160 days	Empire A.C., Harlem, New York City, New York, U.S.	
96	Win	25–4 (67)	Eddie McAndrews	KO	5 (6)	Sep 9, 1916	20 years, 155 days	National A.C., Philadelphia, Pennsylvania, U.S.	
95	Win	24–4 (67)	Joe Azevedo	NWS	10	Aug 18, 1916	20 years, 133 days	Convention Hall, Saratoga Springs, New York, U.S.	
94	Loss	24–4 (66)	Freddie Welsh	NWS	10	Jul 28, 1916	20 years, 112 days	Washington Park A.C., New York City, New York, U.S.	
93	Win	24–4 (65)	Vic Moran	NWS	10	Jun 23, 1916	20 years, 77 days	Harlem S.C., New York City, New York, U.S.	
92	Draw	24–4 (64)	Johnny Dundee	NWS	10	Jun 12, 1916	20 years, 66 days	Madison Square Garden, New York City, New York, U.S.	
91	Win	24–4 (63)	Charley Thomas	NWS	6	May 1, 1916	20 years, 24 days	Olympia A.C., Philadelphia, Pennsylvania, U.S.	
90	Win	24–4 (62)	Phil Bloom	NWS	10	Apr 20, 1916	20 years, 13 days	Madison Square Garden, New York City, New York, U.S.	
89	Win	24–4 (61)	Freddie Welsh	NWS	10	Mar 31, 1916	19 years, 359 days	Madison Square Garden, New York City, New York, U.S.	World lightweight title at stake; (via KO only)
88	Win	24–4 (60)	Shamus O'Brien	TKO	7 (10)	Mar 17, 1916	19 years, 345 days	Harlem S.C., New York City, New York, U.S.	
87	Win	23–4 (60)	Sam Robideau	NWS	6	Mar 13, 1916	19 years, 341 days	Olympia A.C., Philadelphia, Pennsylvania, U.S.	
86	Draw	23–4 (59)	Johnny Dundee	NWS	10	Mar 8, 1916	19 years, 336 days	Madison Square Garden, New York City, New York, U.S.	
85	Win	23–4 (58)	Rocky Kansas	NWS	10	Feb 28, 1916	19 years, 327 days	Broadway Auditorium, Buffalo, New York, U.S.	
84	Win	23–4 (57)	Jimmy Murphy	KO	6 (6)	Feb 21, 1916	19 years, 320 days	Olympia A.C., Philadelphia, Pennsylvania, U.S.	
83	Win	22–4 (57)	Shamus O'Brien	NWS	10	Feb 11, 1916	19 years, 310 days	Arena, Syracuse, New York, U.S.	
82	Win	22–4 (56)	Phil Bloom	TKO	8 (12)	Feb 8, 1916	19 years, 307 days	Hippodrome, Boston, Massachusetts, U.S.	
81	Win	21–4 (56)	Joe Welsh	KO	5 (6)	Jan 1, 1916	19 years, 269 days	Olympia A.C., Philadelphia, Pennsylvania, U.S.	
80	Win	20–4 (56)	Joe Mandot	KO	7 (10)	Dec 17, 1915	19 years, 254 days	Harlem S.C., New York City, New York, U.S.	
79	Win	19–4 (56)	Joe Azevedo	NWS	10	Nov 19, 1915	19 years, 226 days	Harlem S.C., New York City, New York, U.S.	
78	Win	19–4 (55)	Banty Sharpe	NWS	10	Nov 13, 1915	19 years, 220 days	Fairmont A.C., New York City, New York, U.S.	
77	Win	19–4 (54)	Gene Moriarty	KO	3 (10)	Nov 8, 1915	19 years, 215 days	Clermont Avenue Rink, New York City, New York, U.S.	
76	Win	18–4 (54)	Johnny Drummie	NWS	10	Oct 19, 1915	19 years, 195 days	Madison Square Garden, New York City, New York, U.S.	
75	Win	18–4 (53)	Al Thomas	NWS	10	Oct 1, 1915	19 years, 177 days	American A.C., New York City, New York, U.S.	
74	Win	18–4 (52)	Johnny Drummie	NWS	10	Aug 13, 1915	19 years, 128 days	Brown's Gym A.A., Far Rockaway, Queens City, New York City, New York, U.S.	
73	Win	18–4 (51)	Al Schumacher	TKO	7 (10)	Jun 19, 1915	19 years, 73 days	Fairmont A.C., New York City, New York, U.S.	
72	Win	17–4 (51)	Frankie Callahan	NWS	10	May 18, 1915	19 years, 41 days	135th Street A.C., New York City, New York, U.S.	
71	Loss	17–4 (50)	Johnny Kilbane	NWS	10	Apr 29, 1915	19 years, 22 days	Federal A.C., Atlantic Gardens, New York City, New York, U.S.	
70	Win	17–4 (49)	Joe Goldberg	NWS	10	Mar 24, 1915	18 years, 351 days	Fairmont A.C., New York City, New York, U.S.	
69	Win	17–4 (48)	Westside Jimmy Duffy	NWS	10	Mar 20, 1915	18 years, 347 days	Fairmont A.C., New York City, New York, U.S.	
68	Loss	17–4 (47)	Johnny Dundee	NWS	10	Mar 2, 1915	18 years, 329 days	135th Street A.C., New York City, New York, U.S.	
67	Win	17–4 (46)	Patsy Cline	NWS	10	Feb 18, 1915	18 years, 317 days	Fairmont A.C., New York City, New York, U.S.	
66	Win	17–4 (45)	Tommy Langdon	NWS	6	Feb 15, 1915	18 years, 314 days	Olympia A.C., Philadelphia, Pennsylvania, U.S.	
65	Win	17–4 (44)	Johnny Drummie	NWS	10	Jan 16, 1915	18 years, 284 days	Fairmont A.C., New York City, New York, U.S.	
64	Win	17–4 (43)	Jack Sheppard	DQ	5 (10)	Jan 11, 1915	18 years, 279 days	Long Acre A.C., New York City, New York, U.S.	
63	Win	16–4 (43)	Frankie Conifrey	NWS	10	Dec 12, 1914	18 years, 249 days	Fairmont A.C., New York City, New York, U.S.	
62	Win	16–4 (42)	Phil Bloom	NWS	10	Nov 26, 1914	18 years, 233 days	Fairmont A.C., New York City, New York, U.S.	
61	Win	16–4 (41)	Harry Condon	NWS	10	Nov 7, 1914	18 years, 214 days	Fairmont A.C., New York City, New York, U.S.	
60	Win	16–4 (40)	Young Driscoll	NWS	10	Oct 31, 1914	18 years, 207 days	Irving A.C., New York City, New York, U.S.	
59	Draw	16–4 (39)	Phil Bloom	NWS	10	Oct 3, 1914	18 years, 179 days	Irving A.C., New York City, New York, U.S.	
58	Win	16–4 (38)	Joe Thomas	NWS	10	Sep 16, 1914	18 years, 162 days	St. Nicholas Arena, New York City, New York, U.S.	
57	Win	16–4 (37)	Philadelphia Pal Moore	NWS	10	Sep 7, 1914	18 years, 153 days	Fairmont A.C., New York City, New York, U.S.	
56	Win	16–4 (36)	Eddie Wallace	NWS	10	Aug 25, 1914	18 years, 140 days	Broadway Arena, New York City, New York, U.S.	
55	Draw	16–4 (35)	Bobby Reynolds	NWS	10	Aug 22, 1914	18 years, 137 days	Fairmont A.C., New York City, New York, U.S.	
54	Win	16–4 (34)	Tommy Houck	KO	7 (10)	Aug 14, 1914	18 years, 129 days	Alexandria A.C., Elmsford, New York, U.S.	
53	Win	15–4 (34)	Billy Kramer	NWS	10	Jul 18, 1914	18 years, 102 days	Fairmont A.C., New York City, New York, U.S.	
52	Win	15–4 (33)	Teddy Hubbs	NWS	10	Jun 20, 1914	18 years, 74 days	Fairmont A.C., New York City, New York, U.S.	
51	Win	15–4 (32)	Willie Schaefer	NWS	10	May 30, 1914	18 years, 53 days	Fairmont A.C., New York City, New York, U.S.	
50	Loss	15–4 (31)	Young Abe Brown	NWS	10	Apr 3, 1914	17 years, 361 days	Empire A.C., New York City, New York, U.S.	
49	Win	15–4 (30)	Patsy Kline	NWS	10	Mar 3, 1914	17 years, 330 days	Atlantic Garden A.C., New York City, New York, U.S.	
48	Win	15–4 (29)	Joe Stacey	NWS	10	Jan 24, 1914	17 years, 292 days	Fairmont A.C., New York City, New York, U.S.	
47	Loss	15–4 (28)	Phil Bloom	NWS	10	Jan 20, 1914	17 years, 288 days	Atlantic Garden A.C., New York City, New York, U.S.	
46	Loss	15–4 (27)	Kid Black	NWS	10	Jan 6, 1914	17 years, 274 days	Brown's Gym, New York City, New York, U.S.	
45	Win	15–4 (26)	Charley Barry	NWS	10	Jan 3, 1914	17 years, 271 days	Irving A.C., New York City, New York, U.S.	
44	Win	15–4 (25)	Special Delivery Hirsch	NWS	10	Dec 30, 1913	17 years, 267 days	Atlantic Garden A.C., New York City, New York, U.S.	
43	Win	15–4 (24)	Danny Ridge	NWS	10	Dec 20, 1913	17 years, 257 days	Brown's Gym, New York City, New York, U.S.	
42	Loss	15–4 (23)	Harry Tracey	NWS	10	Dec 8, 1913	17 years, 245 days	Olympic A.C., New York City, New York, U.S.	
41	Win	15–4 (22)	Jack Sheppard	NWS	10	Nov 15, 1913	17 years, 222 days	Atlantic Garden A.C., New York City, New York, U.S.	
40	Draw	15–4 (21)	Willie Jones	NWS	10	Oct 23, 1913	17 years, 199 days	Postman A.C., New York City, New York, U.S.	
39	Win	15–4 (20)	Young Fitzsimmons	NWS	10	Oct 4, 1913	17 years, 180 days	Fairmont A.C., New York City, New York, U.S.	
38	Loss	15–4 (19)	Tommy Houck	NWS	10	Sep 27, 1913	17 years, 173 days	Atlantic Garden A.C., New York City, New York, U.S.	
37	Win	15–4 (18)	Harry Ah Chung	TKO	6 (10)	Sep 2, 1913	17 years, 148 days	Atlantic Garden A.C., New York City, New York, U.S.	
36	Loss	14–4 (18)	Frankie Fleming	NWS	10	Aug 16, 1913	17 years, 131 days	Fairmont A.C., New York City, New York, U.S.	
35	Win	14–4 (17)	Walter Hennessey	TKO	3 (10)	Aug 2, 1913	17 years, 117 days	Fairmont A.C., New York City, New York, U.S.	
34	Win	13–4 (17)	Walter Brooks	NWS	10	Jul 12, 1913	17 years, 96 days	Fairmont A.C., New York City, New York, U.S.	
33	Win	13–4 (16)	Johnny Carroll	KO	1 (10)	Jun 20, 1913	17 years, 74 days	Fairmont A.C., New York City, New York, U.S.	
32	Win	12–4 (16)	Dave Cronin	NWS	10	May 29, 1913	17 years, 52 days	New Polo A.C., New York City, New York, U.S.	
31	Loss	12–4 (15)	Eddie Powers	NWS	6	May 22, 1913	17 years, 45 days	Elks' Hall, Rutherford, New Jersey, U.S.	
30	Loss	12–4 (14)	Eddie Powers	NWS	10	May 3, 1913	17 years, 26 days	Atlantic Garden A.C., New York City, New York, U.S.	
29	Draw	12–4 (13)	Johnny Lustig	NWS	10	Jan 14, 1913	16 years, 282 days	Brown's Gym, New York City, New York, U.S.	
28	Loss	12–4 (12)	Jimmy McVeigh	NWS	6	Dec 12, 1912	16 years, 249 days	Rutherford, New Jersey, U.S.	
27	Win	12–4 (11)	Special Delivery Hirsch	NWS	10	Nov 2, 1912	16 years, 209 days	Fairmont A.C., New York City, New York, U.S.	
26	Loss	12–4 (10)	Kid Herman	NWS	10	Sep 28, 1912	16 years, 174 days	Fairmont A.C., New York City, New York, U.S.	
25	Win	12–4 (9)	Kid Ghetto	KO	6 (6)	Sep 13, 1912	16 years, 159 days	Madison Square Garden, New York City, New York, U.S.	The date is uncertain
24	Win	11–4 (9)	Hank McGowan	NWS	6	Aug 30, 1912	16 years, 145 days	Rutherford, New Jersey, U.S.	
23	Loss	11–4 (8)	Kid Ghetto	NWS	6	Jul 31, 1912	16 years, 115 days	St. Nicholas Arena, New York City, New York, U.S.	
22	Win	11–4 (7)	Young Price	KO	5 (6)	Jul 19, 1912	16 years, 103 days	New York City, New York, U.S.	The date is uncertain
21	Loss	10–4 (7)	Frankie Fleming	KO	4 (6)	May 3, 1912	16 years, 26 days	New Polo A.C., New York City, New York, U.S.	
20	Draw	10–3 (7)	Kid Goodman	NWS	6	Apr 26, 1912	16 years, 19 days	Elks' Hall, Rutherford, New Jersey, U.S.	
19	Win	10–3 (6)	Packey Brennan	TKO	3 (6)	Apr 13, 1912	16 years, 6 days	Brown's Gym, New York City, New York, U.S.	
18	Win	9–3 (6)	Young Gross	NWS	4	Apr 8, 1912	16 years, 1 day	Newark, New Jersery, U.S.	
17	ND	9–3 (5)	Battling Travis	ND	6	Mar 26, 1912	15 years, 354 days	New York City, New York, U.S.	The date is uncertain
16	Loss	9–3 (4)	Joe Shugrue	TKO	4 (10)	Mar 5, 1912	15 years, 333 days	Brown's Gym, New York City, New York, U.S.	
15	Win	9–2 (4)	Young Goldie	TKO	2 (6)	Feb 24, 1912	15 years, 323 days	Brown's Gym, New York City, New York, U.S.	
14	Win	8–2 (4)	Billy Meyers	TKO	1 (6)	Feb 12, 1912	15 years, 312 days	Carlyle A.C., New York City, New York, U.S.	
13	Win	7–2 (4)	Joe Kane	KO	5 (6)	Feb 3, 1912	15 years, 302 days	Brown's Gym, New York City, New York, U.S.	
12	Loss	6–2 (4)	Bobby Dunn	KO	? (6)	Jan 22, 1912	15 years, 290 days	Malvern A.C., New York City, New York, U.S.	
11	Win	6–1 (4)	Willie Singer	KO	1 (6)	Jan 9, 1912	15 years, 277 days	Brown's Gym, New York City, New York, U.S.	
10	Win	5–1 (4)	Lewis Gibbs	KO	2 (6)	Jan 8, 1912	15 years, 276 days	Fordon A.C., New York City, New York, U.S.	
9	Win	4–1 (4)	Paddy Parker	KO	4 (6)	Dec 30, 1911	15 years, 267 days	Brown's Gym, New York City, New York, U.S.	
8	Win	3–1 (4)	Smiling Kemp	KO	1 (6)	Dec 25, 1911	15 years, 262 days	Fordon A.C., New York City, New York, U.S.	
7	Win	2–1 (4)	Sammy Marino	NWS	6	Dec 25, 1911	15 years, 262 days	Fordon A.C., New York City, New York, U.S.	
6	Win	2–1 (3)	Young Goldie	NWS	4	Dec 9, 1911	15 years, 246 days	Brown's Gym, New York City, New York, U.S.	
5	Win	2–1 (2)	Young Frankie Pass	KO	3 (6)	Nov 25, 1911	15 years, 232 days	Brown's Gym, New York City, New York, U.S.	
4	ND	1–1 (2)	Battling Travis	ND	6	Nov 11, 1911	15 years, 218 days	New York City, New York, U.S.	The date is approximate
3	ND	1–1 (1)	Johnny Falters	ND	4	Nov 4, 1911	15 years, 211 days	Olympic A.C., New York City, New York, U.S.	The date is approximate
2	Win	1–1	Young Joe Stanley	KO	2 (4)	Oct 28, 1911	15 years, 204 days	New York City, New York, U.S.	The date is approximate
1	Loss	0–1	Mickey Finnegan	TKO	3 (4)	Oct 14, 1911	15 years, 190 days	Fordon A.C., New York, New York City, New York, U.S.	

=== Unofficial record ===
219 fights	185 wins	22 losses
By knockout	70	5
By decision	113	16
By disqualification	2	1
Draws	9	
No contests	3	

Record with the inclusion of newspaper decisions in the win/loss/draw column.

No.	Result	Record	Opponent	Type	Round	Date	Age	Location	Notes
219	Loss	185–22–9 (3)	Jimmy McLarnin	TKO	6 (10)	Oct 7, 1932	36 years, 183 days	Madison Square Garden, New York City, New York, U.S.	
218	Win	185–21–9 (3)	Mike Sarko	PTS	6	Sep 12, 1932	36 years, 158 days	Starlight Park, New York City, New York, U.S.	
217	Win	184–21–9 (3)	Jimmy Abbott	TKO	3 (10)	Sep 8, 1932	36 years, 154 days	Fort Hamilton Arena, New York City, New York, U.S.	
216	Win	183–21–9 (3)	Phil Rafferty	PTS	6	Sep 2, 1932	36 years, 148 days	Long Beach Stadium, Long Beach, New York, U.S.	
215	Win	182–21–9 (3)	Mike Sarko	PTS	6	Aug 19, 1932	36 years, 134 days	Long Beach Stadium, Long Beach, New York, U.S.	
214	Win	181–21–9 (3)	Paulie Walker	UD	10	Aug 11, 1932	36 years, 126 days	Ebbets Field, New York City, New York, U.S.	
213	Win	180–21–9 (3)	Billy Townsend	PTS	10	Jul 28, 1932	36 years, 112 days	Queensboro Stadium, New York City, New York, U.S.	
212	Win	179–21–9 (3)	Eddie Shapiro	PTS	8	Jul 22, 1932	36 years, 106 days	Coney Island Stadium, New York City, New York, U.S.	
211	Win	178–21–9 (3)	Joe Trippe	KO	2 (10)	Jun 20, 1932	36 years, 74 days	Bonacker's Stadium, Rensselaer, New York, U.S.	
210	Win	177–21–9 (3)	Billy Angelo	PTS	10	Jun 16, 1932	36 years, 70 days	Baker Bowl, Philadelphia, Pennsylvania, U.S.	
209	Win	176–21–9 (3)	Andy Saviola	PTS	10	Jun 8, 1932	36 years, 62 days	Coney Island Stadium, New York City, New York, U.S.	
208	Win	175–21–9 (3)	Jimmy Abbott	TKO	6 (10)	May 23, 1932	36 years, 46 days	Paterson, New Jersey, U.S.	
207	Win	174–21–9 (3)	Marty Goldman	KO	2 (10)	May 16, 1932	36 years, 39 days	Laurel Garden, Newark, New Jersey, U.S.	
206	Win	173–21–9 (3)	Willie Garafola	TKO	4 (10)	May 2, 1932	36 years, 25 days	St. Nicholas Arena, New York City, New York, U.S.	
205	Win	172–21–9 (3)	Mike Sarko	PTS	6	Apr 19, 1932	36 years, 12 days	Ridgewood Grove, New York City, New York, U.S.	
204	Win	171–21–9 (3)	Buster Brown	PTS	10	Apr 11, 1932	36 years, 4 days	St. Nicholas Arena, New York City, New York, U.S.	
203	Win	170–21–9 (3)	Billy McMahon	PTS	10	Feb 29, 1932	35 years, 328 days	St. Nicholas Arena, New York City, New York, U.S.	
202	Win	169–21–9 (3)	Buster Brown	PTS	10	Nov 23, 1931	35 years, 230 days	Carlin's Park, Baltimore, Maryland, U.S.	
201	Draw	168–21–9 (3)	Johnny Kasper	PTS	10	Nov 6, 1931	35 years, 213 days	Memorial Auditorium, Burlington, Vermont, U.S.	
200	Win	168–21–8 (3)	Vittorio Livan	KO	3 (10)	Oct 27, 1931	35 years, 203 days	Arena, Boston, Massachusetts, U.S.	
199	Win	167–21–8 (3)	Pal Silvers	TKO	2 (10)	Oct 6, 1931	35 years, 182 days	Queensboro Stadium, New York City, New York, U.S.	
198	Win	166–21–8 (3)	Pal Moran	NWS	10	Aug 11, 1924	28 years, 126 days	Olympic Arena, New York City, New York, U.S.	
197	Win	165–21–8 (3)	Johnny Mendelsohn	NWS	8	Sep 7, 1923	27 years, 153 days	Shibe Park, Philadelphia, Pennsylvania, U.S.	
196	Win	164–21–8 (3)	Lew Tendler	UD	15	Jul 24, 1923	27 years, 108 days	Yankee Stadium, New York City, New York, U.S.	Retained NYSAC and NBA lightweight titles
195	Win	163–21–8 (3)	Alex Hart	NWS	8	Jul 9, 1923	27 years, 93 days	Shibe Park, Philadelphia, Pennsylvania, U.S.	
194	Win	162–21–8 (3)	Pinky Mitchell	TKO	10 (10)	May 29, 1923	27 years, 52 days	Dexter Park Pavilion, Chicago, Illinois, U.S.	
193	Win	161–21–8 (3)	Ever Hammer	NWS	10	Aug 5, 1922	26 years, 120 days	Sky Blue Arena, Michigan City, Indiana, U.S.	
192	Win	160–21–8 (3)	Lew Tendler	NWS	12	Jul 27, 1922	26 years, 111 days	Boyle's Thirty Acres, Jersey City, New Jersey, U.S.	NYSAC and NBA lightweight titles at stake; (via KO only)
191	Win	159–21–8 (3)	Rocky Kansas	TKO	8 (10)	Jul 4, 1922	26 years, 88 days	Sky Blue Arena, Michigan City, Indiana, U.S.	
190	Loss	158–21–8 (3)	Jack Britton	DQ	13 (15)	Jun 26, 1922	26 years, 80 days	Velodrome, New York City, New York, U.S.	For NYSAC and NBA welterweight titles
189	Win	158–20–8 (3)	Jakob "Soldier" Bartfield	PTS	4	Apr 19, 1922	26 years, 12 days	Madison Square Garden, New York City, New York, U.S.	
188	Win	157–20–8 (3)	Johnny Clinton	NWS	10	Mar 20, 1922	25 years, 347 days	Arena, Boston, Massachusetts, U.S.	
187	Win	156–20–8 (3)	Pal Moran	NWS	10	Feb 25, 1922	25 years, 324 days	Louisiana Auditorium, New Orleans, Louisiana, U.S.	
186	Win	155–20–8 (3)	Rocky Kansas	UD	15	Feb 10, 1922	25 years, 309 days	Madison Square Garden, New York City, New York, U.S.	Retained NYSAC and NBA lightweight titles
185	Win	154–20–8 (3)	Tim Droney	NWS	8	Dec 20, 1921	25 years, 257 days	Ice Palace, Philadelphia, Pennsylvania, U.S.	
184	Win	153–20–8 (3)	Sailor Friedman	NWS	8	Nov 22, 1921	25 years, 229 days	Ice Palace, Philadelphia, Pennsylvania, U.S.	
183	Win	152–20–8 (3)	Rocky Kansas	NWS	12	Jun 6, 1921	25 years, 60 days	Federal League Baseball Park, Harrison, New Jersey, U.S.	NYSAC and NBA lightweight titles at stake; (via KO only)
182	Win	151–20–8 (3)	Joe Welling	NWS	8	Feb 24, 1921	24 years, 323 days	Coliseum, Saint Louis, Missouri, U.S.	
181	Win	150–20–8 (3)	Eddie Moy	TKO	3 (10)	Feb 21, 1921	24 years, 320 days	Madison Square Garden, New York City, New York, U.S.	
180	Win	149–20–8 (3)	Richie Mitchell	TKO	6 (15)	Jan 14, 1921	24 years, 282 days	Madison Square Garden, New York City, New York, U.S.	Retained NYSAC and NBA lightweight titles
179	Win	148–20–8 (3)	Joe Welling	TKO	14 (15)	Nov 26, 1920	24 years, 233 days	Madison Square Garden, New York City, New York, U.S.	Retained NYSAC lightweight title
178	Win	147–20–8 (3)	Harlem Eddie Kelly	DQ	5 (12)	Nov 17, 1920	24 years, 224 days	Commonwealth Sporting Club, New York City, New York, U.S.	
177	Win	146–20–8 (3)	K.O. Willie Loughlin	NWS	10	Nov 12, 1920	24 years, 219 days	Third Regiment Armory, Camden, New Jersey, U.S.	
176	Win	145–20–8 (3)	Johnny Tillman	PTS	10	Oct 18, 1920	24 years, 194 days	Armory, Akron, Ohio, U.S.	
175	Win	144–20–8 (3)	Johnny Sheppard	TKO	3 (10)	Oct 8, 1920	24 years, 184 days	6th Regiment Armory, Paterson, New Jersey, U.S.	
174	Win	143–20–8 (3)	Frankie Britt	TKO	5 (10)	Oct 4, 1920	24 years, 180 days	Wethersfield Baseball Grounds, Hartford, Connecticut, U.S.	
173	Win	142–20–8 (3)	Pal Moran	NWS	10	Sep 25, 1920	24 years, 171 days	East Chicago, Illinois, U.S.	
172	Win	141–20–8 (3)	K.O. Willie Loughlin	KO	9 (10)	Sep 10, 1920	24 years, 156 days	Armory, Camden, New Jersey, U.S.	
171	Win	140–20–8 (3)	Charley White	KO	9 (10)	Jul 5, 1920	24 years, 89 days	Floyd Fitzsimmons Arena, Benton Harbor, Michigan, U.S.	
170	Win	139–20–8 (3)	Johnny Dundee	NWS	8	Feb 9, 1920	23 years, 308 days	4th Regiment Armory, Jersey City, New Jersey, U.S.	
169	Win	138–20–8 (3)	Jake Abel	NWS	10	Dec 22, 1919	23 years, 259 days	Auditorium, Atlanta, Georgia, U.S.	
168	Win	137–20–8 (3)	James Red Herring	TKO	6 (8)	Dec 19, 1919	23 years, 256 days	Southern A.C., Memphis, Tennessee, U.S.	
167	Win	136–20–8 (3)	Mel Coogan	TKO	2 (8)	Dec 10, 1919	23 years, 247 days	4th Regiment Armory, Jersey City, New Jersey, U.S.	
166	Win	135–20–8 (3)	Jakob "Soldier" Bartfield	NWS	6	Nov 27, 1919	23 years, 234 days	Olympia A.C., Philadelphia, Pennsylvania, U.S.	
165	Win	134–20–8 (3)	Lockport Jimmy Duffy	TKO	2 (15)	Nov 17, 1919	23 years, 224 days	Convention Hall, Tulsa, Oklahoma, U.S.	Retained world lightweight title
164	Win	133–20–8 (3)	Jakob "Soldier" Bartfield	NWS	8	Nov 10, 1919	23 years, 217 days	4th Regiment Armory, Jersey City, New Jersey, U.S.	
163	Win	132–20–8 (3)	Phil Bloom	NWS	10	Oct 15, 1919	23 years, 191 days	Arena Gardens, Detroit, Michigan, U.S.	
162	Win	131–20–8 (3)	Charley Metrie	TKO	7 (10)	Oct 1, 1919	23 years, 177 days	Arena Gardens, Detroit, Michigan, U.S.	
161	Win	130–20–8 (3)	Johnny Dundee	NWS	8	Sep 17, 1919	23 years, 163 days	1st Regiment Armory, Newark, New Jersey, U.S.	
160	Win	129–20–8 (3)	Johnny Clinton	NWS	10	Sep 8, 1919	23 years, 154 days	Arena, Syracuse, New York, U.S.	
159	Win	128–20–8 (3)	Jakob "Soldier" Bartfield	NWS	6	Sep 4, 1919	23 years, 150 days	Shibe Park, Philadelphia, Pennsylvania, U.S.	
158	Win	127–20–8 (3)	Patsy Cline	NWS	6	Aug 11, 1919	23 years, 126 days	Shibe Park, Philadelphia, Pennsylvania, U.S.	
157	Win	126–20–8 (3)	Joe Malone	TKO	3 (6)	Jul 23, 1919	23 years, 107 days	Newport, Rhode Island, U.S.	
156	Win	125–20–8 (3)	Johnny Dundee	NWS	6	Jun 16, 1919	23 years, 70 days	Shibe Park, Philadelphia, Pennsylvania, U.S.	
155	Win	124–20–8 (3)	Charley Pitts	NWS	10	Jun 9, 1919	23 years, 63 days	Theatre francais, Montreal, Quebec, Canada	
154	Win	123–20–8 (3)	Young George Erne	KO	6 (8)	May 21, 1919	23 years, 44 days	Grand Theater, Trenton, New Jersey, U.S.	
153	Win	122–20–8 (3)	Willie Ritchie	TKO	8 (8)	Apr 28, 1919	23 years, 21 days	1st Regiment Armory, Newark, New Jersey, U.S.	
152	Win	121–20–8 (3)	Harvey Thorpe	NWS	10	Mar 26, 1919	22 years, 353 days	Joplin, Missouri, U.S.	
151	Loss	120–20–8 (3)	Willie Ritchie	NWS	4	Feb 21, 1919	22 years, 320 days	Civic Auditorium, San Francisco, California, U.S.	
150	Win	120–19–8 (3)	Wildcat Leonard	KO	4 (4)	Feb 7, 1919	22 years, 306 days	Hoffman A.C., Sacramento, California, U.S.	
149	Win	119–19–8 (3)	Spider Roach	NWS	4	Feb 5, 1919	22 years, 304 days	Auditorium, Oakland, California, U.S.	
148	Win	118–19–8 (3)	Joe Benjamin	NWS	4	Jan 31, 1919	22 years, 299 days	Civic Auditorium, San Francisco, California, U.S.	
147	Win	117–19–8 (3)	Johnny Dundee	NWS	8	Jan 20, 1919	22 years, 288 days	1st Regiment Armory, Newark, New Jersey, U.S.	
146	Win	116–19–8 (3)	Harlem Eddie Kelly	NWS	6	Jan 13, 1919	22 years, 281 days	Olympia A.C., Philadelphia, Pennsylvania, U.S.	
145	Win	115–19–8 (3)	Paul Doyle	NWS	6	Jan 1, 1919	22 years, 269 days	Olympia A.C., Philadelphia, Pennsylvania, U.S.	
144	Draw	114–19–8 (3)	Ted Kid Lewis	NWS	8	Sep 23, 1918	22 years, 169 days	Weidenmeyer's Park, Newark, New Jersey, U.S.	World welterweight title at stake; (via KO only)
143	Win	114–19–7 (3)	Harry Pierce	NWS	6	Sep 16, 1918	22 years, 162 days	Olympia A.C., Philadelphia, Pennsylvania, U.S.	
142	Win	113–19–7 (3)	Willie Gradwell	TKO	5 (8)	Jul 22, 1918	22 years, 106 days	4th Regiment Armory, Jersey City, New Jersey, U.S.	
141	Win	112–19–7 (3)	Willie Jackson	NWS	6	Jul 16, 1918	22 years, 100 days	Madison Square Garden, New York City, New York, U.S.	
140	Win	111–19–7 (3)	Jack Brazzo	TKO	8 (8)	Jul 4, 1918	22 years, 88 days	Wildwood Beach Baseball Park, Wildwood, New Jersey, U.S.	
139	Win	110–19–7 (3)	Jack Britton	NWS	6	Jun 25, 1918	22 years, 79 days	Shibe Park, Philadelphia, Pennsylvania, U.S.	
138	Win	109–19–7 (3)	Barney Adair	NWS	4	Jun 6, 1918	22 years, 60 days	Broadway Auditorium, Buffalo, New York, U.S.	
137	Win	108–19–7 (3)	Mike Golindo	PTS	4	May 25, 1918	22 years, 48 days	City Stadium, San Diego, California, U.S.	
136	Win	107–19–7 (3)	Louis ReesMcCarthy	NWS	4	May 20, 1918	22 years, 43 days	Shrine Temple, Los Angeles, California, U.S.	
135	Win	106–19–7 (3)	Johnny McCarthy	NWS	4	May 10, 1918	22 years, 33 days	Civic Auditorium, San Francisco, California, U.S.	
134	Win	105–19–7 (3)	Jack Brazzo	TKO	4 (6)	Apr 13, 1918	22 years, 6 days	National A.C., Philadelphia, Pennsylvania, U.S.	
133	Win	104–19–7 (3)	Young Joe Borrell	NWS	6	Apr 8, 1918	22 years, 1 day	Olympia A.C., Philadelphia, Pennsylvania, U.S.	
132	Win	103–19–7 (3)	Freddie Kelly	NWS	6	Dec 19, 1917	21 years, 256 days	National A.C., Philadelphia, Pennsylvania, U.S.	
131	Win	102–19–7 (3)	Chick Brown	TKO	5 (10)	Dec 17, 1917	21 years, 254 days	Arena, New Haven, Connecticut, U.S.	
130	Win	101–19–7 (3)	Patsy Cline	NWS	6	Dec 12, 1917	21 years, 249 days	Olympia A.C., Philadelphia, Pennsylvania, U.S.	
129	Win	100–19–7 (3)	Gene Delmont	KO	8 (10)	Dec 5, 1917	21 years, 242 days	Auditorium, Saint Paul, Minnesota, U.S.	
128	Win	99–19–7 (3)	Battling Sailor Frank Kirk	KO	1 (10)	Nov 28, 1917	21 years, 235 days	Stockyards Stadium, Denver, Colorado, U.S.	
127	Win	98–19–7 (3)	Toughy Ramser	KO	7 (10)	Oct 24, 1917	21 years, 199 days	Cleveland A.C., Cleveland, Ohio, U.S.	
126	Win	97–19–7 (3)	Young George Erne	NWS	6	Oct 23, 1917	21 years, 199 days	Broadway Auditorium, Buffalo, New York, U.S.	
125	Win	96–19–7 (3)	Young Eddie Wagond	NWS	6	Oct 22, 1917	21 years, 198 days	Olympia A.C., Philadelphia, Pennsylvania, U.S.	
124	Win	95–19–7 (3)	Jack Britton	NWS	10	Oct 19, 1917	21 years, 195 days	Harlem S.C., New York City, New York, U.S.	
123	Win	94–19–7 (3)	Vic Moran	KO	2 (10)	Oct 5, 1917	21 years, 181 days	Harlem S.C., New York City, New York, U.S.	
122	Win	93–19–7 (3)	Eddie Dorsey	KO	2 (10)	Sep 27, 1917	21 years, 173 days	Broadway Auditorium, Buffalo, New York, U.S.	
121	Win	92–19–7 (3)	Leo Johnson	TKO	1 (10)	Sep 21, 1917	21 years, 167 days	Harlem S.C., New York City, New York, U.S.	Retained world lightweight title
120	Win	91–19–7 (3)	Phil Bloom	KO	2 (10)	Sep 14, 1917	21 years, 160 days	Forbes Field, Pittsburgh, Pennsylvania, U.S.	
119	Win	90–19–7 (3)	Jimmy Paul	NWS	6	Sep 12, 1917	21 years, 158 days	Fairmont A.C., New York City, New York, U.S.	
118	Win	89–19–7 (3)	Young Rector	TKO	5 (10)	Sep 3, 1917	21 years, 149 days	Island Stadium, Toronto, Ontario, Canada	
117	Win	88–19–7 (3)	Johnny Kilbane	TKO	3 (6)	Jul 25, 1917	21 years, 109 days	Shibe Park, Philadelphia, Pennsylvania, U.S.	
116	Win	87–19–7 (3)	Johnny Nelson	TKO	3 (10)	Jun 18, 1917	21 years, 72 days	Harlem S.C., New York City, New York, U.S.	
115	Win	86–19–7 (3)	Joe Welsh	NWS	6	Jun 4, 1917	21 years, 58 days	Olympia A.C., Philadelphia, Pennsylvania, U.S.	
114	Win	85–19–7 (3)	Freddie Welsh	TKO	9 (10)	May 28, 1917	21 years, 51 days	Manhattan Casino, New York City, New York, U.S.	Won world lightweight title
113	Win	84–19–7 (3)	Eddie Shannon	TKO	6 (10)	May 10, 1917	21 years, 33 days	Clermont Avenue Rink, New York City, New York, U.S.	
112	Win	83–19–7 (3)	Charley Thomas	TKO	6 (6)	May 7, 1917	21 years, 30 days	Olympia A.C., Philadelphia, Pennsylvania, U.S.	
111	Win	82–19–7 (3)	Richie Mitchell	TKO	7 (10)	Apr 19, 1917	21 years, 12 days	Auditorium, Milwaukee, Wisconsin, U.S.	
110	Win	81–19–7 (3)	Packy Hommey	KO	9 (10)	Mar 22, 1917	20 years, 349 days	Fairmont A.C., New York City, New York, U.S.	
109	Win	80–19–7 (3)	Johnny Tillman	NWS	6	Mar 12, 1917	20 years, 339 days	Olympia A.C., Philadelphia, Pennsylvania, U.S.	
108	Win	79–19–7 (3)	Jimmy Reagan	NWS	10	Feb 28, 1917	20 years, 327 days	Manhattan Casino, New York City, New York, U.S.	
107	Win	78–19–7 (3)	Frankie Callahan	NWS	10	Feb 1, 1917	20 years, 300 days	Clermont Avenue Rink, New York City, New York, U.S.	
106	Win	77–19–7 (3)	Phil Bloom	NWS	10	Jan 30, 1917	20 years, 298 days	Broadway S.C., New York City, New York, U.S.	
105	Win	76–19–7 (3)	Eddie Wallace	NWS	6	Jan 22, 1917	20 years, 290 days	Olympia A.C., Philadelphia, Pennsylvania, U.S.	
104	Win	75–19–7 (3)	Chick Simler	NWS	10	Nov 28, 1916	20 years, 235 days	Empire A.C., Harlem, New York City, New York, U.S.	
103	Win	74–19–7 (3)	Harvey Thorpe	KO	12 (12)	Nov 21, 1916	20 years, 228 days	Coliseum, Saint Louis, Missouri, U.S.	
102	Loss	73–19–7 (3)	Johnny Dundee	NWS	6	Nov 15, 1916	20 years, 222 days	Olympia A.C., Philadelphia, Pennsylvania, U.S.	
101	Win	73–18–7 (3)	Stanley Yoakum	NWS	10	Nov 10, 1916	20 years, 217 days	Harlem S.C., New York City, New York, U.S.	
100	Win	72–18–7 (3)	Ever Hammer	TKO	12 (15)	Oct 18, 1916	20 years, 194 days	Convention Hall, Kansas City, Missouri, U.S.	
99	Win	71–18–7 (3)	Johnny Nelson	NWS	6	Oct 9, 1916	20 years, 185 days	Olympia A.C., Philadelphia, Pennsylvania, U.S.	
98	Win	70–18–7 (3)	Johnny Tillman	NWS	6	Sep 25, 1916	20 years, 171 days	Olympia A.C., Philadelphia, Pennsylvania, U.S.	
97	Win	69–18–7 (3)	Frankie Conifrey	TKO	7 (10)	Sep 14, 1916	20 years, 160 days	Empire A.C., Harlem, New York City, New York, U.S.	
96	Win	68–18–7 (3)	Eddie McAndrews	KO	5 (6)	Sep 9, 1916	20 years, 155 days	National A.C., Philadelphia, Pennsylvania, U.S.	
95	Win	67–18–7 (3)	Joe Azevedo	NWS	10	Aug 18, 1916	20 years, 133 days	Convention Hall, Saratoga Springs, New York, U.S.	
94	Loss	66–18–7 (3)	Freddie Welsh	NWS	10	Jul 28, 1916	20 years, 112 days	Washington Park A.C., New York City, New York, U.S.	
93	Win	66–17–7 (3)	Vic Moran	NWS	10	Jun 23, 1916	20 years, 77 days	Harlem S.C., New York City, New York, U.S.	
92	Draw	65–17–7 (3)	Johnny Dundee	NWS	10	Jun 12, 1916	20 years, 66 days	Madison Square Garden, New York City, New York, U.S.	
91	Win	65–17–6 (3)	Charley Thomas	NWS	6	May 1, 1916	20 years, 24 days	Olympia A.C., Philadelphia, Pennsylvania, U.S.	
90	Win	64–17–6 (3)	Phil Bloom	NWS	10	Apr 20, 1916	20 years, 13 days	Madison Square Garden, New York City, New York, U.S.	
89	Win	63–17–6 (3)	Freddie Welsh	NWS	10	Mar 31, 1916	19 years, 359 days	Madison Square Garden, New York City, New York, U.S.	World lightweight title at stake; (via KO only)
88	Win	62–17–6 (3)	Shamus O'Brien	TKO	7 (10)	Mar 17, 1916	19 years, 345 days	Harlem S.C., New York City, New York, U.S.	
87	Win	61–17–6 (3)	Sam Robideau	NWS	6	Mar 13, 1916	19 years, 341 days	Olympia A.C., Philadelphia, Pennsylvania, U.S.	
86	Draw	60–17–6 (3)	Johnny Dundee	NWS	10	Mar 8, 1916	19 years, 336 days	Madison Square Garden, New York City, New York, U.S.	
85	Win	60–17–5 (3)	Rocky Kansas	NWS	10	Feb 28, 1916	19 years, 327 days	Broadway Auditorium, Buffalo, New York, U.S.	
84	Win	59–17–5 (3)	Jimmy Murphy	KO	6 (6)	Feb 21, 1916	19 years, 320 days	Olympia A.C., Philadelphia, Pennsylvania, U.S.	
83	Win	58–17–5 (3)	Shamus O'Brien	NWS	10	Feb 11, 1916	19 years, 310 days	Arena, Syracuse, New York, U.S.	
82	Win	57–17–5 (3)	Phil Bloom	TKO	8 (12)	Feb 8, 1916	19 years, 307 days	Hippodrome, Boston, Massachusetts, U.S.	
81	Win	56–17–5 (3)	Joe Welsh	KO	5 (6)	Jan 1, 1916	19 years, 269 days	Olympia A.C., Philadelphia, Pennsylvania, U.S.	
80	Win	55–17–5 (3)	Joe Mandot	KO	7 (10)	Dec 17, 1915	19 years, 254 days	Harlem S.C., New York City, New York, U.S.	
79	Win	54–17–5 (3)	Joe Azevedo	NWS	10	Nov 19, 1915	19 years, 226 days	Harlem S.C., New York City, New York, U.S.	
78	Win	53–17–5 (3)	Banty Sharpe	NWS	10	Nov 13, 1915	19 years, 220 days	Fairmont A.C., New York City, New York, U.S.	
77	Win	52–17–5 (3)	Gene Moriarty	KO	3 (10)	Nov 8, 1915	19 years, 215 days	Clermont Avenue Rink, New York City, New York, U.S.	
76	Win	51–17–5 (3)	Johnny Drummie	NWS	10	Oct 19, 1915	19 years, 195 days	Madison Square Garden, New York City, New York, U.S.	
75	Win	50–17–5 (3)	Al Thomas	NWS	10	Oct 1, 1915	19 years, 177 days	American A.C., New York City, New York, U.S.	
74	Win	49–17–5 (3)	Johnny Drummie	NWS	10	Aug 13, 1915	19 years, 128 days	Brown's Gym A.A., New York City, New York, U.S.	
73	Win	48–17–5 (3)	Al Schumacher	TKO	7 (10)	Jun 19, 1915	19 years, 73 days	Fairmont A.C., New York City, New York, U.S.	
72	Win	47–17–5 (3)	Frankie Callahan	NWS	10	May 18, 1915	19 years, 41 days	135th Street A.C., New York City, New York, U.S.	
71	Loss	46–17–5 (3)	Johnny Kilbane	NWS	10	Apr 29, 1915	19 years, 22 days	Federal A.C., Atlantic Gardens, New York City, New York, U.S.	
70	Win	46–16–5 (3)	Joe Goldberg	NWS	10	Mar 24, 1915	18 years, 351 days	Fairmont A.C., New York City, New York, U.S.	
69	Win	45–16–5 (3)	Westside Jimmy Duffy	NWS	10	Mar 20, 1915	18 years, 347 days	Fairmont A.C., New York City, New York, U.S.	
68	Loss	44–16–5 (3)	Johnny Dundee	NWS	10	Mar 2, 1915	18 years, 329 days	135th Street A.C., New York City, New York, U.S.	
67	Win	44–15–5 (3)	Patsy Cline	NWS	10	Feb 18, 1915	18 years, 317 days	Fairmont A.C., New York City, New York, U.S.	
66	Win	43–15–5 (3)	Tommy Langdon	NWS	6	Feb 15, 1915	18 years, 314 days	Olympia A.C., Philadelphia, Pennsylvania, U.S.	
65	Win	42–15–5 (3)	Johnny Drummie	NWS	10	Jan 16, 1915	18 years, 284 days	Fairmont A.C., New York City, New York, U.S.	
64	Win	41–15–5 (3)	Jack Sheppard	DQ	5 (10)	Jan 11, 1915	18 years, 279 days	Long Acre A.C., New York City, New York, U.S.	
63	Win	40–15–5 (3)	Frankie Conifrey	NWS	10	Dec 12, 1914	18 years, 249 days	Fairmont A.C., New York City, New York, U.S.	
62	Win	39–15–5 (3)	Phil Bloom	NWS	10	Nov 26, 1914	18 years, 233 days	Fairmont A.C., New York City, New York, U.S.	
61	Win	38–15–5 (3)	Harry Condon	NWS	10	Nov 7, 1914	18 years, 214 days	Fairmont A.C., New York City, New York, U.S.	
60	Win	37–15–5 (3)	Young Driscoll	NWS	10	Oct 31, 1914	18 years, 207 days	Irving A.C., New York City, New York, U.S.	
59	Draw	36–15–5 (3)	Phil Bloom	NWS	10	Oct 3, 1914	18 years, 179 days	Irving A.C., New York City, New York, U.S.	
58	Win	36–15–4 (3)	Joe Thomas	NWS	10	Sep 16, 1914	18 years, 162 days	St. Nicholas Arena, New York City, New York, U.S.	
57	Win	35–15–4 (3)	Philadelphia Pal Moore	NWS	10	Sep 7, 1914	18 years, 153 days	Fairmont A.C., New York City, New York, U.S.	
56	Win	34–15–4 (3)	Eddie Wallace	NWS	10	Aug 25, 1914	18 years, 140 days	Broadway Arena, New York City, New York, U.S.	
55	Draw	33–15–4 (3)	Bobby Reynolds	NWS	10	Aug 22, 1914	18 years, 137 days	Fairmont A.C., New York City, New York, U.S.	
54	Win	33–15–3 (3)	Tommy Houck	KO	7 (10)	Aug 14, 1914	18 years, 129 days	Alexandria A.C., Elmsford, New York, U.S.	
53	Win	32–15–3 (3)	Billy Kramer	NWS	10	Jul 18, 1914	18 years, 102 days	Fairmont A.C., New York City, New York, U.S.	
52	Win	31–15–3 (3)	Teddy Hubbs	NWS	10	Jun 20, 1914	18 years, 74 days	Fairmont A.C., New York City, New York, U.S.	
51	Win	30–15–3 (3)	Willie Schaefer	NWS	10	May 30, 1914	18 years, 53 days	Fairmont A.C., New York City, New York, U.S.	
50	Loss	29–15–3 (3)	Young Abe Brown	NWS	10	Apr 3, 1914	17 years, 361 days	Empire A.C., New York City, New York, U.S.	
49	Win	29–14–3 (3)	Patsy Kline	NWS	10	Mar 3, 1914	17 years, 330 days	Atlantic Garden A.C., New York City, New York, U.S.	
48	Win	28–14–3 (3)	Joe Stacey	NWS	10	Jan 24, 1914	17 years, 292 days	Fairmont A.C., New York City, New York, U.S.	
47	Loss	27–14–3 (3)	Phil Bloom	NWS	10	Jan 20, 1914	17 years, 288 days	Atlantic Garden A.C., New York City, New York, U.S.	
46	Loss	27–13–3 (3)	Kid Black	NWS	10	Jan 6, 1914	17 years, 274 days	Brown's Gym, New York City, New York, U.S.	
45	Win	27–12–3 (3)	Charley Barry	NWS	10	Jan 3, 1914	17 years, 271 days	Irving A.C., New York City, New York, U.S.	
44	Win	26–12–3 (3)	Special Delivery Hirsch	NWS	10	Dec 30, 1913	17 years, 267 days	Atlantic Garden A.C., New York City, New York, U.S.	
43	Win	25–12–3 (3)	Danny Ridge	NWS	10	Dec 20, 1913	17 years, 257 days	Brown's Gym, New York City, New York, U.S.	
42	Loss	24–12–3 (3)	Harry Tracey	NWS	10	Dec 8, 1913	17 years, 245 days	Olympic A.C., New York City, New York, U.S.	
41	Win	24–11–3 (3)	Jack Sheppard	NWS	10	Nov 15, 1913	17 years, 222 days	Atlantic Garden A.C., New York City, New York, U.S.	
40	Draw	23–11–3 (3)	Willie Jones	NWS	10	Oct 23, 1913	17 years, 199 days	Postman A.C., New York City, New York, U.S.	
39	Win	23–11–2 (3)	Young Fitzsimmons	NWS	10	Oct 4, 1913	17 years, 180 days	Fairmont A.C., New York City, New York, U.S.	
38	Loss	22–11–2 (3)	Tommy Houck	NWS	10	Sep 27, 1913	17 years, 173 days	Atlantic Garden A.C., New York City, New York, U.S.	
37	Win	22–10–2 (3)	Harry Ah Chung	TKO	6 (10)	Sep 2, 1913	17 years, 148 days	Atlantic Garden A.C., New York City, New York, U.S.	
36	Loss	21–10–2 (3)	Frankie Fleming	NWS	10	Aug 16, 1913	17 years, 131 days	Fairmont A.C., New York City, New York, U.S.	
35	Win	21–9–2 (3)	Walter Hennessey	TKO	3 (10)	Aug 2, 1913	17 years, 117 days	Fairmont A.C., New York City, New York, U.S.	
34	Win	20–9–2 (3)	Walter Brooks	NWS	10	Jul 12, 1913	17 years, 96 days	Fairmont A.C., New York City, New York, U.S.	
33	Win	19–9–2 (3)	Johnny Carroll	KO	1 (10)	Jun 20, 1913	17 years, 74 days	Fairmont A.C., New York City, New York, U.S.	
32	Win	18–9–2 (3)	Dave Cronin	NWS	10	May 29, 1913	17 years, 52 days	New Polo A.C., New York City, New York, U.S.	
31	Loss	17–9–2 (3)	Eddie Powers	NWS	6	May 22, 1913	17 years, 45 days	Elks' Hall, Rutherford, New Jersey, U.S.	
30	Loss	17–8–2 (3)	Eddie Powers	NWS	10	May 3, 1913	17 years, 26 days	Atlantic Garden A.C., New York City, New York, U.S.	
29	Draw	17–7–2 (3)	Johnny Lustig	NWS	10	Jan 14, 1913	16 years, 282 days	Brown's Gym, New York City, New York, U.S.	
28	Loss	17–7–1 (3)	Jimmy McVeigh	NWS	6	Dec 12, 1912	16 years, 249 days	Rutherford, New Jersey, U.S.	
27	Win	17–6–1 (3)	Special Delivery Hirsch	NWS	10	Nov 2, 1912	16 years, 209 days	Fairmont A.C., New York City, New York, U.S.	
26	Loss	16–6–1 (3)	Kid Herman	NWS	10	Sep 28, 1912	16 years, 174 days	Fairmont A.C., New York City, New York, U.S.	
25	Win	16–5–1 (3)	Kid Ghetto	KO	6 (6)	Sep 13, 1912	16 years, 159 days	Madison Square Garden, New York City, New York, U.S.	The date is uncertain
24	Win	15–5–1 (3)	Hank McGowan	NWS	6	Aug 30, 1912	16 years, 145 days	Rutherford, New Jersey, U.S.	
23	Loss	14–5–1 (3)	Kid Ghetto	NWS	6	Jul 31, 1912	16 years, 115 days	St. Nicholas Arena, New York City, New York, U.S.	
22	Win	14–4–1 (3)	Young Price	KO	5 (6)	Jul 19, 1912	16 years, 103 days	New York City, New York, U.S.	The date is uncertain
21	Loss	13–4–1 (3)	Frankie Fleming	KO	4 (6)	May 3, 1912	16 years, 26 days	New Polo A.C., New York City, New York, U.S.	
20	Draw	13–3–1 (3)	Kid Goodman	NWS	6	Apr 26, 1912	16 years, 19 days	Elks' Hall, Rutherford, New Jersey, U.S.	
19	Win	13–3 (3)	Packey Brennan	TKO	3 (6)	Apr 13, 1912	16 years, 6 days	Brown's Gym, New York City, New York, U.S.	
18	Win	12–3 (3)	Young Gross	NWS	4	Apr 8, 1912	16 years, 1 day	Newark, New Jersery, U.S.	
17	ND	11–3 (3)	Battling Travis	ND	6	Mar 26, 1912	15 years, 354 days	New York City, New York, U.S.	The date is uncertain
16	Loss	11–3 (2)	Joe Shugrue	TKO	4 (10)	Mar 5, 1912	15 years, 333 days	Brown's Gym, New York City, New York, U.S.	
15	Win	11–2 (2)	Young Goldie	TKO	2 (6)	Feb 24, 1912	15 years, 323 days	Brown's Gym, New York City, New York, U.S.	
14	Win	10–2 (2)	Billy Meyers	TKO	1 (6)	Feb 12, 1912	15 years, 312 days	Carlyle A.C., New York City, New York, U.S.	
13	Win	9–2 (2)	Joe Kane	KO	5 (6)	Feb 3, 1912	15 years, 302 days	Brown's Gym, New York City, New York, U.S.	
12	Loss	8–2 (2)	Bobby Dunn	KO	? (6)	Jan 22, 1912	15 years, 290 days	Malvern A.C., New York City, New York, U.S.	
11	Win	8–1 (2)	Willie Singer	KO	1 (6)	Jan 9, 1912	15 years, 277 days	Brown's Gym, New York City, New York, U.S.	
10	Win	7–1 (2)	Lewis Gibbs	KO	2 (6)	Jan 8, 1912	15 years, 276 days	Fordon A.C., New York City, New York, U.S.	
9	Win	6–1 (2)	Paddy Parker	KO	4 (6)	Dec 30, 1911	15 years, 267 days	Brown's Gym, New York City, New York, U.S.	
8	Win	5–1 (2)	Smiling Kemp	KO	1 (6)	Dec 25, 1911	15 years, 262 days	Fordon A.C., New York City, New York, U.S.	
7	Win	4–1 (2)	Sammy Marino	NWS	6	Dec 25, 1911	15 years, 262 days	Fordon A.C., New York City, New York, U.S.	
6	Win	3–1 (2)	Young Goldie	NWS	4	Dec 9, 1911	15 years, 246 days	Brown's Gym, New York City, New York, U.S.	
5	Win	2–1 (2)	Young Frankie Pass	KO	3 (6)	Nov 25, 1911	15 years, 232 days	Brown's Gym, New York City, New York, U.S.	
4	ND	1–1 (2)	Battling Travis	ND	6	Nov 11, 1911	15 years, 218 days	New York City, New York, U.S.	The date is approximate
3	ND	1–1 (1)	Johnny Falters	ND	4	Nov 4, 1911	15 years, 211 days	Olympic A.C., New York City, New York, U.S.	The date is approximate
2	Win	1–1	Young Joe Stanley	KO	2 (4)	Oct 28, 1911	15 years, 204 days	New York City, New York, U.S.	The date is approximate
1	Loss	0–1	Mickey Finnegan	TKO	3 (4)	Oct 14, 1911	15 years, 190 days	Fordon A.C., New York, New York City, New York, U.S.	

== Titles in boxing ==
=== Major world titles ===
- World lightweight champion (135 lbs)
- NYSAC lightweight champion (135 lbs)
- NBA (WBA) lightweight champion (Note: Awarded the inaugural NBA title in January 1921.) (135 lbs)

=== The Ring magazine titles ===
- The Ring lightweight champion (Note: Awarded inaugural title in 1924.) (135 lbs)

=== Undisputed titles ===
- Undisputed lightweight champion (Note: The first ever undisputed lightweight champion.)

== See also ==
- Undisputed championship
- Lineal championship
- List of world lightweight boxing champions
- List of select Jewish boxers

== Notes and references ==
=== References ===
Achievements
Preceded by Freddie Welsh	World Lightweight Champion; May 28, 1917 – January 15, 1925; Retired	Succeeded by Jimmy Goodrich
Awards
Preceded by Sam Langford	The Ring magazine Fighter of the Decade; 1920s	Succeeded by Henry Armstrong
Preceded by Boxers of the Armed Forces	Edward J. Neil Trophy; 1944	Succeeded by James J. Walker
