= Marty Goldman =

American boxer (1910–1987)

Personal information
- Nationality: American
- Born: March 7, 1910
- Died: December 17, 1987 (aged 77)
- Height: 5 ft 7 in (1.70 m)
- Weight: Lightweight

Boxing career

Boxing record
- Total fights: 49
- Wins: 35
- Win by KO: 10
- Losses: 11
- Draws: 3

Marty Goldman (March 7, 1910 – February 17, 1987) was an American boxer of Jewish descent in the late 1920s and early 1930s. He was managed for much of his career by Abe Attell out of Brooklyn, New York and trained by the legendary Ray Arcel.

Goldman's career record was 35 Wins (10 KO's), 11 losses, 3 Draws in 47 career fights.

He was born on March 7, 1910, most likely in New York's lower East Side, where he was raised. He trained in his youth at Brooklyn's Beecher's Gym, like many outstanding Jewish boxers of his era including Solly Krieger and Al "Bummy" Davis.

In his first bout at Madison Square Garden on December 14, 1928, he demonstrated defensive skills and managed well placed blows, defeating Harry Carlton in a six round points decision. Both boxers fought just under modern lightweight range.

In a highlight of his early career on February 8, 1929, fighting as a lightweight, he defeated Tommy DeCarlo before a crowded Madison Square Garden audience by technical knockout in the fifth of six scheduled rounds.

He defeated Ray Rivera on July 4, 1930, in an eight-round points decision in Brooklyn.

In one of his most notable wins, Goldman knocked out former Bantamweight Champion Eddie "Cannonball" Martin on August 11, 1930, at Dexter Park Arena in Queens, New York. A bad cut over Martin's eye caused the referee to stop the contest in the ninth round. Goldman had an advantage in height and weight, and battered Martin throughout the bout, but Martin remained game and attempted to gain points and mount a defense throughout the bout. The Brooklyn Daily Eagle wrote that Goldman's blows outnumbered his opponent's nearly five to one. Martin scored best in the sixth round with his left hook. He put an off-balance Goldman down for a count of six in the first round.

He defeated Philly Griffin, a future contender for the world junior welterweight title against Tony Canzoneri, on January 12, 1931, at Laurel Park in Newark, New Jersey. Jack Dempsey refereed.

Nearing the end of his more competitive career, he lost decisively to Eddie McNamara on January 5, 1932, in an eight-round points decision at the Elks Club in Brooklyn, New York. McNamara nearly had Goldman out on his feet with a two-handed assault in the seventh, though Marty fought on. The Brooklyn Daily Eagle wrote that McNamara took all eight rounds, but was booed and warned by the referee for using his elbows against Goldman in several rounds.

Louisville boxer Cecil Payne outpointed Goldman on March 20, 1931, in ten rounds before a slim depression-era crowd of 8,000 at New York's Madison Square Garden. A prolific boxer, a few months later Payne would contend for the world junior welterweight title against Tony Canzoneri.

He drew with Al Rossi in a ten-round points decision on November 9, 1931, in Newark, New Jersey. Goldman was floored for a six count in the second from a right to the chin by Rossi, but rallied in the last three rounds to obtain the draw ruling. The fighting was fast and furious.

Two years after he defeated former bantamweight champion Eddie Martin on May 16, 1932, Goldman was knocked out by Benny Leonard, the former World Lightweight Champion, who was attempting a comeback after losing most of his money in the stock market crash of 1929. Boxing as a welterweight, Leonard knocked out Goldman only 45 seconds into the second round. The bout was fought at Laurel Gardens in Newark, New Jersey. Leonard's final blow was a short but powerful right to the jaw, which was preceded by a brief flurry of jabs. To many fans, Leonard's footwork and use of rapid combination punching brought back images of the Leonard of old, but in reality Goldman, though a solid club fighter, was far from a world-ranked welterweight contender.

According to family members, Goldman was sponsored by Damon Runyon, author of Guys and Dolls, and Owney Madden, owner of the famed Cotton Club. He was also the subject of articles written by Walter Winchell and Ed Sullivan, both fans of his.

Goldman fought at venues such as Madison Square Garden, Ebbets Field & Yankee Stadium during his career.
