= Mel Coogan =

American boxer

Personal information
- Nationality: United States
- Born: Melvin George Coogan; August 6, 1896 Brooklyn, NY
- Weight: Lightweight

Boxing career
- Stance: Southpaw

Boxing record
- Total fights: 183
- Wins: 120
- Win by KO: 18
- Losses: 32
- Draws: 29
- No contests: 2

Melvin George Coogan (August 6, 1896 – December 27, 1957) was an American boxer from Brooklyn. He was undefeated in his first nine fights with a record of 7–0–9.

Coogan fought Frankie Callahan in Brooklyn, New York. but lost by decision. He fought Johnny Dundee in Jersey City, New Jersey, where he won by decision. He also fought Lew Tendler. Both fighters fought to a no contest in Philadelphia, Pennsylvania. From 1914 to 1919 he had a record of 65–7–10. Coogan never had a title shot.
