= Lew Tendler =

American boxer (1898–1970)

Personal information
- Nickname: Lefty Lew
- Nationality: American
- Born: Lew Tendler; September 28, 1898 Philadelphia, Pennsylvania, U.S.
- Died: November 7, 1970 (aged 72) Atlantic City, New Jersey, U.S.
- Height: 5 ft 6 in (1.68 m)
- Weight: Welterweight; Lightweight; Bantamweight

Boxing career
- Reach: 70 in (178 cm)
- Stance: Southpaw

Boxing record
- Total fights: 171
- Wins: 145
- Win by KO: 38
- Losses: 16
- Draws: 8
- No contests: 2

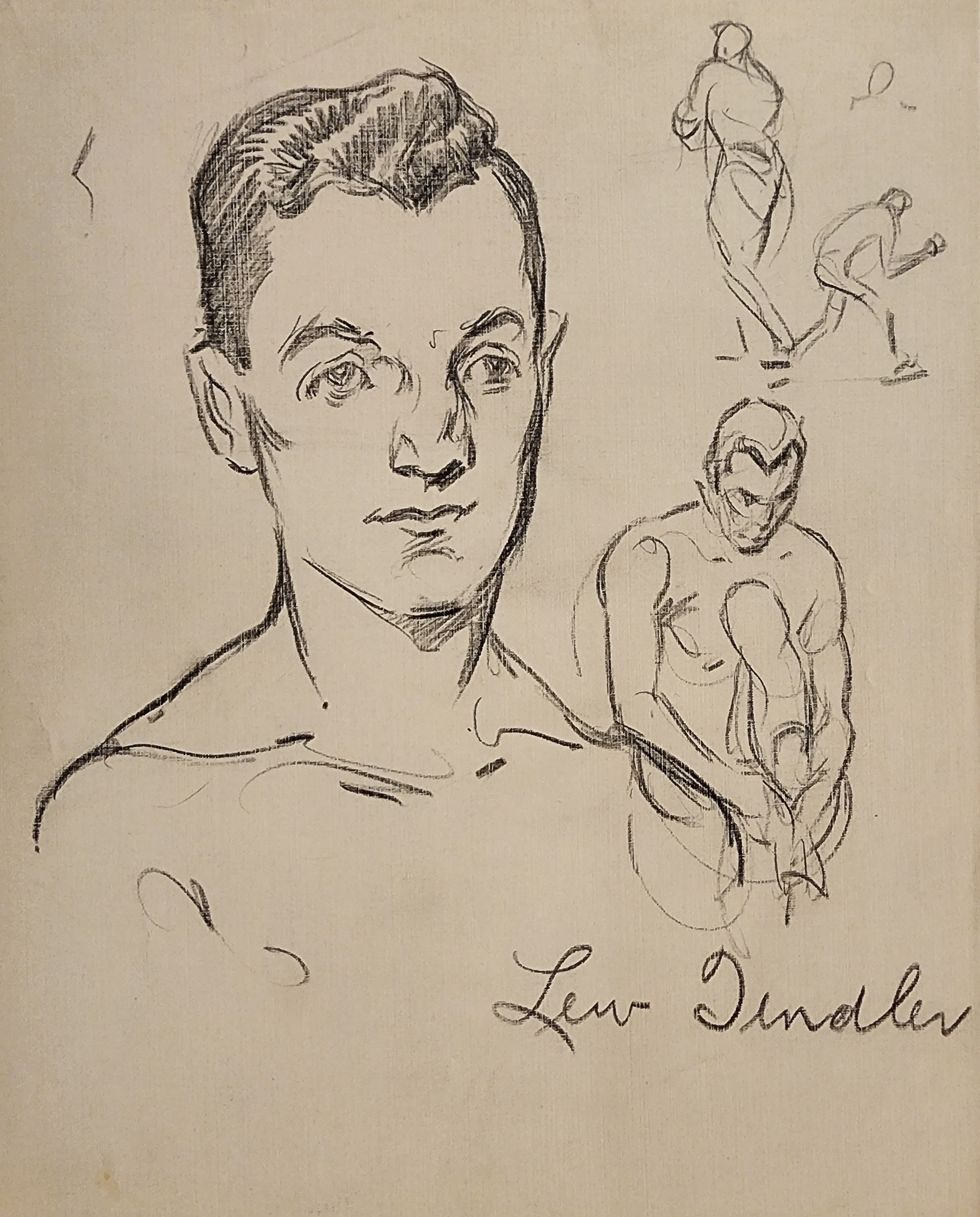
Signed drawing of Lew Tendler by Manuel Rosenberg 1924

"Lefty" Lew Tendler (September 28, 1898, in Philadelphia, Pennsylvania – November 5, 1970, in Atlantic City, New Jersey) was an American boxer. He is generally considered one of the best boxers to never have won a world title, though he was a top rated contender for both the world light and welterweight championships.

The statistical boxing website BoxRec lists Tendler as the tenth ranked lightweight of all time, while The Ring Magazine founder Nat Fleischer placed him at #9.

He is a member of the International Jewish Sports Hall of Fame, the Ring Magazine Hall of Fame, the World Boxing Hall of Fame, and the International Boxing Hall of Fame.

== Early life and career ==
On September 28, 1898, in the South Philadelphia Jewish ghetto, Lew Tendler was born. Only two years after his birth, his father died after a protracted illness, leaving the family in dire financial problems. He began selling newspapers on a city street corner at the age of six, defending his territory from fierce rivals with his fists. He began boxing as an amateur around twelve, often competing in tournaments at local burlesque houses. Turning pro in 1913 at the age of fifteen, he began his career as a bantamweight. His first bout on November 6, 1913, against Mickey Brown, was arranged by Phil Glassman and the Philadelphia Newsboy Association.

In an important early career win, Tendler decisively defeated future world bantamweight champion Pete Herman on February 28, 1916, in six rounds, repeatedly scoring points with his right. Herman had difficulty mounting an effective defense, and bled from his nose through much of the bout where he caught frequent rights from Tendler. Herman would take the world bantamweight championship the following year and hold it almost continuously for four years.

=== Close bouts with champion Johnny Dundee, 1917 ===
On October 1, 1917, Tendler defeated future world junior lightweight champion Johnny Dundee in a close six-round newspaper decision in Philadelphia. Tendler took the lead in most of the fighting, used his reach advantage to dominate at long range, and landed more blows to take the decision. He finished strong in the sixth. On March 26, 1917, Tendler had previously defeated Dundee in another very close six-round newspaper decision of two Philadelphia papers, though one reporter felt the power of Dundee's blows to the head and body should have won him the decision.

Future world lightweight champion Rocky Kansas fell to Tendler on October 29, 1917, in a somewhat decisive six-round newspaper decision in Philadelphia according to a decision of the Philadelphia Record. Tendler scored with straight lefts, upper cuts and right crosses, and had the better of much of the fighting. In a closer first round, Kansas landed a powerful right to Tendler's ear. In two other meetings with Kansas, Tendler won a ten-round newspaper decision on New Years Day, 1919, but dropped a fifteen-round points decision on October 21, 1921, at New York's Madison Square Garden.

Tendler first decisively defeated Willie Jackson, a leading contender for the lightweight title in a six-round newspaper decision in Philadelphia, on January 7, 1918. Tendler forced the fighting from the opening round, showed better defense, and gave Jackson a beating in nearly every round. Jackson was able to score only when coming out of clinches at close range. Tendler defeated Jackson again that year in a fifteen-round points decision in New Haven, and continued to gain victory over Jackson in Philadelphia and Milwaukee by newspaper decisions once a year from 1919 to 1921.

George "KO" Chaney first fell to Tendler on September 18, 1918, in a six-round newspaper decision in Philadelphia. Tendler knocked down Chaney for a count of six in the third round. Tendler scored best in the first three and final rounds. Tendler would also defeat Chaney in a first-round knockout on June 4, 1919, at Philadelphia's Shibe Park. A left to the jaw preceded by a hard right to the same spot put Chaney down for the count only 1:12 into the first round. Chaney was one of Tendler's more skilled early opponents.

Tendler first defeated fellow Jewish boxer Frankie Callahan, another leading contender for the lightweight title, on July 6, 1918, in an eight-round newspaper decision in Atlantic City. In three other meetings, Tendler won a six-round newspaper decision in Philadelphia, a ninth-round technical knockout in Boston where Callahan broke his wrist, and a rough fifth-round technical knockout at an open-air arena in Lawrence, Massachusetts, on September 18, 1920, where Callahan told his manager he had broken a rib in the second round. Callahan fought through three more rounds, but was unable to answer the bell for the sixth.

=== Attempts at lightweight championship against Benny Leonard, 1922-3 ===
On July 27, 1922, Tendler fell to fellow Jewish boxer Benny Leonard in a twelve-round newspaper decision in Jersey City in a lightweight world title match, that may have been the most remarkable bout of Tendler's career. Before a record audience of over 60,000 enthralled fans, Leonard won five rounds, Tendler four, with three even. Tendler may have led in the first five rounds, as Leonard could not adjust to or penetrate his unique Southpaw stance, style, and defense. In the eighth, Tendler crashed a terrific left to the midsection which had followed a left to the head, and Leonard held on to Tendler as he sank to one knee. Then Leonard rose and distracted Tendler by mumbling a few words, then going to a clinche to rest for much of the remainder of the round. Tendler never delivered the follow-up knockout blow, and Leonard, getting time to recover, dominated the next seven rounds. In their last meeting on July 24, 1923, Leonard won a unanimous fifteen-round decision at Yankee Stadium before an extraordinary crowd of 58,000. The bout took place in the Bronx in another lightweight world title match. Leonard excelled in the speed and precision of his attack, while still managing to ward off most of his opponent's blows, particularly Tendler's strong left. Leonard demonstrated his mastery of ring tactics against an opponent who became sluggish, and was unable to mount the offensive he had shown in their bout the previous July. By one account, Leonard managed to land three blows for every one of Tendler's, demonstrating his speed and mastery of tactics. With the huge crowd, Leonard's take home pay exceeded $130,000, an extraordinary sum for the era.

Tendler first defeated Sailor Friedman, a highly rated lightweight, on December 16, 1921, in an eight-round newspaper decision at New York's Madison Square Garden. Tendler floored Friedman four times in the second round in the Garden. Friedman came back hard in the fourth, staggering Tendler with a left to the jaw, and performed well in the fifth. The combatants went back and forth in the following rounds, though Friedman continued do land a few solid blows as late as the twelfth and fourteenth. In three previous meetings that year, on September 13, August 24, and February 28, Tendler won in newspaper decisions in Milwaukee, and Philadelphia.

Tendler defeated reigning world light heavyweight champion Pinky Mitchell in their last meeting on February 18, 1924, in a close ten-round newspaper decision in Milwaukee. The Wisconsin State Journal considered the non-title bout slow and wrote that Tendler's blows lacked steam. Had Mitchell been two pounds lighter, and been knocked out, Tendler would have taken the junior welterweight championship. Tendler had defeated Mitchell in a previous meeting on May 19, 1920, in another ten-round newspaper decision in Milwaukee. Tendler got his range in the final seven rounds, and won points for taking the offense through most of the bout. His defense was exceptional, though Mitchell's defense kept him from harm and he benefited somewhat from greater reach.

=== Attempt at welterweight championship against Mickey Walker, 1924 ===
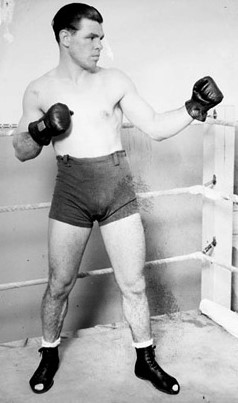
Mickey Walker

Tendler fell to Mickey Walker in a ten-round unanimous decision on June 2, 1924, in an attempt at the National Boxing Association (NBA) world welterweight championship. The Pittsburgh Post gave Walker five rounds with only the seventh and eighth to Tendler. In a fast and exciting bout, Tendler drove Walker from rope to rope in the seventh with rights and lefts to the body and head, looking like he might take the decision. Walker had an edge in the final two rounds, however, as Tendler tired, and scored most frequently with blows to the body.

Tendler was knocked out only once in his career on January 19, 1925, against Jack Zivic in Pittsburgh. In the fifth round, a left by Zivic sent Tendler spinning to the floor for a count of nine. Another left hurt Tendler, and then a barrage of lefts and rights sent him to the canvas again. Tendler's manager Phil Glassman threw in the towel ending the fight. In a rematch, however, in Philadelphia five months later before 30,000 fans, Tendler dominated in a ten-round unanimous decision at Shibe Park. The Pittsburgh Gazette Times gave Tendler seven of ten rounds, particularly the last half of the bout, and wrote that he "outboxed, outslugged, and outpunched" Zivic, particularly in the closing rounds.

In one of his last bouts with a top talent on July 16, 1925, Tendler drew with future world welterweight champion Joe Dundee by decision, in ten fast and hard-fought rounds before 10,000 at Shibe Park in Philadelphia. Tendler was rocked several times by the younger Dundee's rapid right, and took a serious beating in several rounds. Dundee caught Tendler off balance in the ninth with a left hook, and he fell briefly to his hands. The more skilled ring veteran Tendler was forced to clinch at times. The Philadelphia Inquirer believed Dundee had the better of the bout, and many in the audience felt the same. Tendler mounted an effective defense, however, and often went on the offensive during the fast bout.

=== Life after boxing ===
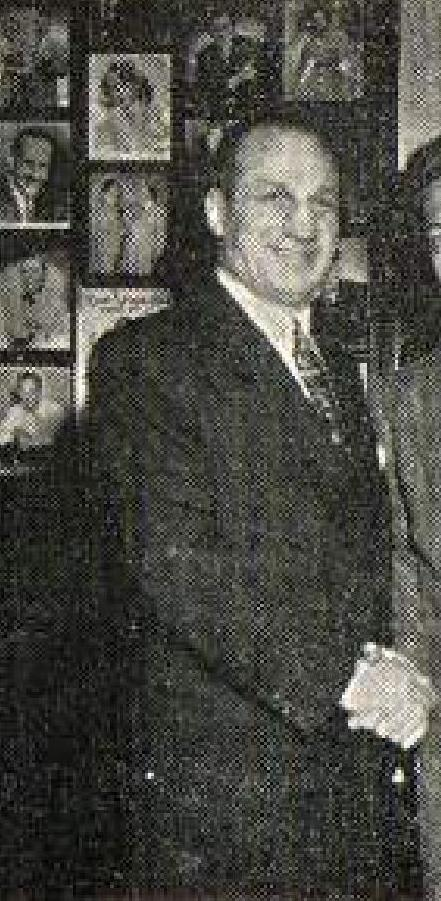
Tendler at his Philadelphia restaurant in 1953.

After retiring from boxing in 1928, Tendler opened a restaurant in Philadelphia in 1932 which specialized in steaks, known as Tendler's Tavern. He later opened branches in Atlantic City and Miami Beach. Around 1911, he married Celia Lasker, with whom he had three sons. Lew and Celia remained married throughout his life.

Tendler died on November 5, 1970, at Shore Memorial Hospital in Somers Point, a suburb of Atlantic City, New Jersey, of an arterial clot. His memorial service was in Philadelphia, and he was buried in nearby Roosevelt Memorial Park in Trevose, Pennsylvania, a Philadelphia suburb. He left nine grandchildren.

== Professional boxing record ==
All information in this section is derived from BoxRec, unless otherwise stated.

=== Official record ===
171 fights	59 wins	11 losses
By knockout	38	1
By decision	21	7
By disqualification	0	3
Draws	2	
No contests	2	
Newspaper decisions/draws	97	

All newspaper decisions are officially regarded as “no decision” bouts and are not counted in the win/loss/draw column.

No.	Result	Record	Opponent	Type	Round, time	Date	Age	Location	Notes
171	Win	59–11–2 (99)	Nate Goldman	TKO	5 (10)	Jun 18, 1928	29 years, 264 days	Shibe Park, Philadelphia, Pennsylvania, US	
170	Loss	58–11–2 (99)	Ace Hudkins	UD	10	Jan 20, 1928	29 years, 114 days	Madison Square Garden, New York City, New York, US	
169	Win	58–10–2 (99)	Jack McFarland	TKO	8 (12)	Jan 2, 1928	29 years, 96 days	Arena, Philadelphia, Pennsylvania, US	
168	Win	57–10–2 (99)	Hilario Martinez	SD	10	Dec 12, 1927	29 years, 75 days	Arena, Philadelphia, Pennsylvania, US	
167	Win	56–10–2 (99)	Vincent Forgione	PTS	10	Nov 7, 1927	29 years, 40 days	Arena, Philadelphia, Pennsylvania, US	
166	Win	55–10–2 (99)	Pat Haley	KO	1 (8)	Oct 3, 1927	29 years, 5 days	Arena, Philadelphia, Pennsylvania, US	
165	Win	54–10–2 (99)	Sailor Darden	PTS	10	Sep 12, 1927	28 years, 349 days	Sesquicentennial Stadium, Philadelphia, Pennsylvania, US	
164	Win	53–10–2 (99)	Willie Greb	KO	4 (10)	Aug 30, 1927	28 years, 336 days	Carnival Park, West Manayunk, Pennsylvania, US	
163	Win	52–10–2 (99)	Danny Gordon	KO	8 (10)	Aug 9, 1927	28 years, 193 days	Carnival Park, West Manayunk, Pennsylvania, US	
162	Loss	51–10–2 (99)	Ace Hudkins	PTS	10	Apr 12, 1927	28 years, 196 days	Olympic Auditorium, Los Angeles, California, US	
161	Win	51–9–2 (99)	Young Harry Wills	TKO	8 (10)	Mar 15, 1927	28 years, 168 days	Olympic Auditorium, Los Angeles, California, US	
160	Loss	50–9–2 (99)	Tommy Jordan	DQ	4 (10)	Nov 1, 1926	28 years, 34 days	Broadway Arena, New York City, New York, US	Jordan claimed to be fouled when dropped by a body shot Referee agreed
159	Win	50–8–2 (99)	Farmer Joe Cooper	PTS	10	Oct 15, 1926	28 years, 17 days	Madison Square Garden, New York City, New York, US	
158	Win	49–8–2 (99)	Danny Gordon	PTS	10	Oct 4, 1926	28 years, 6 days	Carnival Park, West Manayunk, Pennsylvania, US	
157	Win	48–8–2 (99)	Al Conway	NWS	6	Sep 15, 1926	27 years, 352 days	Airport, Atlantic City, New Jersey, US	
156	Win	48–8–2 (98)	Joe Reno	PTS	10	Sep 1, 1926	27 years, 338 days	Shibe Park, Philadelphia, Pennsylvania, US	
155	Win	47–8–2 (98)	Mickey Forkins	TKO	5 (?)	Jul 29, 1926	27 years, 304 days	Madison Square Garden, New York City, New York, US	
154	Win	46–8–2 (98)	Joe Reno	PTS	10	Jul 12, 1926	27 years, 287 days	Shibe Park, Philadelphia, Pennsylvania, US	
153	Loss	45–8–2 (98)	Meyer Cohen	PTS	10	Jun 28, 1926	27 years, 273 days	Hurley Stadium, Hartford, Connecticut, US	
152	Win	45–7–2 (98)	Georgie Russell	TKO	6 (8)	Jun 25, 1926	27 years, 270 days	Bacharach Ball Park, Atlantic City, New Jersey, US	
151	Win	44–7–2 (98)	Basil Galiano	PTS	10	May 28, 1926	27 years, 242 days	Coney Island Stadium, New York City, New York, US	
150	Win	43–7–2 (98)	Don Boyer	TKO	6 (12)	May 19, 1926	27 years, 233 days	Armory, Toledo, Ohio, US	
149	Win	42–7–2 (98)	Jack McFarland	NWS	10	May 3, 1926	27 years, 217 days	Laurel Garden, Newark, New Jersey, US	
148	Draw	42–7–2 (97)	Joe Reno	NWS	8	Apr 19, 1926	27 years, 203 days	Waltz Dream Arena, Atlantic City, New Jersey, US	
147	Draw	42–7–2 (96)	Joe Dundee	PTS	10	Jul 16, 1925	26 years, 291 days	Shibe Park, Philadelphia, Pennsylvania, US	
146	Win	42–7–1 (96)	Jack Zivic	UD	10	Jun 8, 1925	26 years, 253 days	Shibe Park, Philadelphia, Pennsylvania, US	
145	Win	41–7–1 (96)	Tony Julian	TKO	3 (10)	Apr 6, 1925	26 years, 190 days	Arena, Philadelphia, Pennsylvania, US	
144	Win	40–7–1 (96)	Nate Goldman	TKO	5 (10)	Mar 16, 1925	26 years, 169 days	Arena, Philadelphia, Pennsylvania, US	
143	Win	39–7–1 (96)	Joe Reno	TKO	5 (10)	Feb 23, 1925	26 years, 148 days	Arena, Philadelphia, Pennsylvania, US	
142	Loss	38–7–1 (96)	Jack Zivic	TKO	5 (10)	Jan 19, 1925	26 years, 113 days	Motor Square Garden, Pittsburgh, Pennsylvania, US	
141	Win	38–6–1 (96)	Joe Tiplitz	PTS	10	Dec 25, 1924	26 years, 88 days	108th Field Artillery Armory, Philadelphia, Pennsylvania, US	
140	Win	37–6–1 (96)	Joe Libby	PTS	10	Nov 24, 1924	26 years, 57 days	108th Field Artillery Armory, Philadelphia, Pennsylvania, US	
139	Win	36–6–1 (96)	K.O. Mars	NWS	10	Aug 18, 1924	25 years, 325 days	Redland Field, Cincinnati, Ohio, US	
138	Draw	36–6–1 (95)	Bobby Barrett	MD	10	Jul 21, 1924	25 years, 297 days	Shibe Park, Philadelphia, Pennsylvania, US	
137	Loss	36–6 (95)	Mickey Walker	UD	10	Jun 2, 1924	25 years, 248 days	Shibe Park, Philadelphia, Pennsylvania, US	For NYSAC, NBA, and The Ring welterweight titles
136	Win	36–5 (95)	Sailor Friedman	PTS	10	Apr 15, 1924	25 years, 200 days	Mechanics Building, Boston, Massachusetts, US	
135	Win	35–5 (95)	Ted Marchant	TKO	4 (10)	Mar 17, 1924	25 years, 171 days	Arena, Philadelphia, Pennsylvania, US	
134	Win	34–5 (95)	Pinky Mitchell	NWS	10	Feb 18, 1924	25 years, 143 days	Auditorium, Milwaukee, Wisconsin, US	
133	Win	34–5 (94)	Ray Mitchell	PTS	10	Jan 28, 1924	25 years, 122 days	Arena, Philadelphia, Pennsylvania, US	
132	Loss	33–5 (94)	Nate Goldman	PTS	10	Jan 1, 1924	25 years, 95 days	Arena, Philadelphia, Pennsylvania, US	
131	Win	33–4 (94)	Pep O'Brien	UD	10	Dec 28, 1923	25 years, 91 days	109th Infantry Armory, Scranton, Pennsylvania, US	
130	Win	32–4 (94)	Jack Palmer	NWS	8	Nov 19, 1923	25 years, 52 days	Arena, Philadelphia, Pennsylvania, US	
129	Loss	32–4 (93)	Benny Leonard	UD	15	Jul 23, 1923	24 years, 298 days	Yankee Stadium, New York City, New York, US	For NYSAC and NBA lightweight titles
128	Win	32–3 (93)	Tim Droney	NWS	10	Jun 25, 1923	24 years, 270 days	Midway Arena, Allentown, Pennsylvania, US	
127	Win	32–3 (92)	Pal Moran	NWS	8	Jun 18, 1923	24 years, 263 days	Shibe Park, Philadelphia, Pennsylvania, US	
126	Win	32–3 (91)	Jack Lawler	TKO	5 (8)	Jan 29, 1923	24 years, 123 days	Arena, Philadelphia, Pennsylvania, US	
125	Win	31–3 (91)	Pal Moran	PTS	15	Jan 19, 1923	24 years, 113 days	Madison Square Garden, New York City, New York, US	
124	Win	30–3 (91)	Johnny Mendelsohn	NWS	10	Nov 3, 1922	24 years, 36 days	Auditorium, Milwaukee, Wisconsin, US	
123	Win	30–3 (90)	Ever Hammer	NWS	8	Sep 11, 1922	23 years, 348 days	Shibe Park, Philadelphia, Pennsylvania, US	
122	Loss	30–3 (89)	Benny Leonard	NWS	12	Jul 27, 1922	23 years, 302 days	Boyle's Thirty Acres, Jersey City, New Jersey, US	NYSAC and NBA lightweight titles at stake; (via KO only)
121	Win	30–3 (88)	Bobby Barrett	TKO	7 (8)	Jun 6, 1922	23 years, 251 days	Shibe Park, Philadelphia, Pennsylvania, US	
120	Win	29–3 (88)	Johnny Dundee	UD	15	May 5, 1922	23 years, 219 days	Madison Square Garden, New York City, New York, US	
119	Win	28–3 (88)	Tim Droney	NWS	8	Apr 17, 1922	23 years, 201 days	Olympia A.C., Philadelphia, Pennsylvania, US	
118	Loss	28–3 (87)	Charley Pitts	DQ	7 (12)	Apr 10, 1922	23 years, 194 days	Broadway Arena, New York City, New York, US	
117	Win	28–2 (87)	Alex Hart	NWS	8	Mar 13, 1922	23 years, 166 days	Olympia A.C., Philadelphia, Pennsylvania, US	
116	Win	28–2 (86)	Johnny Sheppard	KO	3 (12)	Mar 11, 1922	23 years, 164 days	Clermont Avenue Rink, New York City, New York, US	
115	Win	27–2 (86)	Oakland Jimmy Duffy	TKO	8 (12)	Feb 24, 1922	23 years, 149 days	Madison Square Garden, New York City, New York, US	Duffy refused to fight after claiming he was fouled. The referee disagreed with this claim
114	NC	26–2 (86)	Mel Coogan	NC	1 (8)	Feb 1, 1922	23 years, 126 days	Olympia A.C., Philadelphia, Pennsylvania, US	NC after an accidental head clash and Coogan could not continue
113	Win	26–2 (85)	Barney Adair	NWS	8	Jan 2, 1922	23 years, 96 days	Olympia A.C., Philadelphia, Pennsylvania, US	
112	Win	26–2 (84)	Sailor Friedman	PTS	15	Dec 16, 1921	23 years, 79 days	Madison Square Garden, New York City, New York, US	
111	Win	25–2 (84)	Manuel Azevedo	TKO	2 (8)	Nov 24, 1921	23 years, 57 days	Olympia A.C., Philadelphia, Pennsylvania, US	
110	Loss	24–2 (84)	Rocky Kansas	PTS	15	Oct 21, 1921	23 years, 23 days	Madison Square Garden, New York City, New York, US	
109	Win	24–1 (84)	Sailor Friedman	NWS	8	Sep 13, 1921	22 years, 350 days	Shibe Park, Philadelphia, Pennsylvania, US	
108	Win	24–1 (83)	Sailor Friedman	NWS	8	Aug 24, 1921	22 years, 330 days	Shibe Park, Philadelphia, Pennsylvania, US	
107	Win	24–1 (82)	Tim Droney	NWS	8	Jul 4, 1921	22 years, 279 days	Lauer's Park, Reading, Pennsylvania, US	
106	Win	24–1 (81)	Sailor Friedman	NWS	10	Feb 28, 1921	22 years, 153 days	Auditorium, Milwaukee, Wisconsin, US	
105	Win	24–1 (80)	Willie Jackson	NWS	10	Jan 26, 1921	22 years, 120 days	Auditorium, Milwaukee, Wisconsin, US	
104	Win	24–1 (79)	Otto Wallace	TKO	4 (8)	Jan 1, 1921	22 years, 95 days	Olympia A.C., Philadelphia, Pennsylvania, US	
103	Win	23–1 (79)	Chick Simler	TKO	7 (8)	Dec 25, 1920	22 years, 88 days	Olympia A.C., Philadelphia, Pennsylvania, US	
102	Win	22–1 (79)	Johnny Tillman	NWS	8	Nov 25, 1920	22 years, 58 days	National A.C., Philadelphia, Pennsylvania, US	
101	Win	22–1 (78)	Harlem Eddie Kelly	KO	5 (8)	Nov 8, 1920	22 years, 41 days	Olympia A.C., Philadelphia, Pennsylvania, US	
100	Win	21–1 (78)	Joe Welling	NWS	10	Oct 26, 1920	22 years, 28 days	Auditorium, Milwaukee, Wisconsin, US	
99	Win	21–1 (77)	Frankie Callahan	TKO	5 (12)	Sep 18, 1920	21 years, 356 days	Lawrence, Massachusetts, US	
98	Win	20–1 (77)	Willie Jackson	NWS	8	Jul 12, 1920	21 years, 288 days	Shibe Park, Philadelphia, Pennsylvania, US	
97	Win	20–1 (76)	Richie Mitchell	NWS	10	Jun 9, 1920	21 years, 255 days	Auditorium, Milwaukee, Wisconsin, US	
96	Draw	20–1 (75)	Eddie Fitzsimmons	NWS	8	May 24, 1920	21 years, 239 days	Shibe Park, Philadelphia, Pennsylvania, US	
95	Win	20–1 (74)	Pinky Mitchell	NWS	10	May 19, 1920	21 years, 234 days	Auditorium, Milwaukee, Wisconsin, US	
94	Win	20–1 (73)	Georges Papin	KO	6 (12)	May 12, 1920	21 years, 227 days	4th Regiment Armory, Jersey City, New Jersey, US	
93	Win	19–1 (73)	Johnny Tillman	NWS	10	May 3, 1920	21 years, 218 days	Auditorium, Saint Paul, Minnesota, US	
92	Win	19–1 (72)	Banty Sharpe	KO	5 (8)	Apr 19, 1920	21 years, 204 days	Lyceum Theatre, Paterson, New Jersey, US	
91	Win	18–1 (72)	Tim Droney	NWS	6	Apr 5, 1920	21 years, 190 days	Fulton Opera House, Lancaster, Pennsylvania, US	
90	Win	18–1 (71)	Stanley Hinckle	TKO	6 (6)	Mar 29, 1920	21 years, 183 days	Olympia A.C., Philadelphia, Pennsylvania, US	
89	Win	17–1 (71)	Johnny Martin	NWS	6	Mar 20, 1920	21 years, 174 days	National A.C., Philadelphia, Pennsylvania, US	
88	Win	17–1 (70)	Johnny Rose	NWS	6	Mar 15, 1920	21 years, 169 days	Olympia A.C., Philadelphia, Pennsylvania, US	
87	Win	17–1 (69)	Dick DeSanders	KO	3 (6)	Feb 28, 1920	21 years, 153 days	National A.C., Philadelphia, Pennsylvania, US	
86	Win	16–1 (69)	Allentown Dundee	KO	2 (6), 1:20	Feb 23, 1920	21 years, 148 days	Olympia A.C., Philadelphia, Pennsylvania, US	
85	Win	15–1 (69)	Johnny Noye	TKO	2 (6)	Nov 27, 1919	21 years, 60 days	National A.C., Philadelphia, Pennsylvania, US	
84	Win	14–1 (69)	Charley Pitts	NWS	6	Nov 22, 1919	21 years, 55 days	National A.C., Philadelphia, Pennsylvania, US	
83	Win	14–1 (68)	Young George Erne	KO	2 (6)	Nov 8, 1919	21 years, 41 days	National A.C., Philadelphia, Pennsylvania, US	
82	Win	13–1 (68)	Harvey Thorpe	NWS	10	Oct 27, 1919	21 years, 29 days	Detroit, Michigan, US	
81	Loss	13–1 (67)	Johnny Noye	DQ	3 (12)	Oct 21, 1919	21 years, 23 days	Stockyards Stadium, Denver, Colorado, US	
80	Win	13–0 (67)	Stanley Yoakum	TKO	4 (12)	Oct 10, 1919	21 years, 12 days	Stockyards Stadium, Denver, Colorado, US	
79	Win	12–0 (67)	Willie Jackson	NWS	6	Aug 4, 1919	20 years, 310 days	Shibe Park, Philadelphia, Pennsylvania, US	
78	Win	12–0 (66)	Joe Welling	NWS	6	Jul 14, 1919	20 years, 289 days	Shibe Park, Philadelphia, Pennsylvania, US	
77	Win	12–0 (65)	Packy Hommey	NWS	8	Jun 13, 1919	20 years, 258 days	Pennsgrove, New Jersey, US	
76	Win	12–0 (64)	George K.O. Chaney	KO	1 (6), 1:12	Jun 4, 1919	20 years, 249 days	Shibe Park, Philadelphia, Pennsylvania, US	
75	Win	11–0 (64)	Al Murphy	NWS	10	May 13, 1919	20 years, 227 days	Nesbitt Theatre, Wilkes-Barre, Pennsylvania, US	
74	Win	11–0 (63)	Cal Delaney	NWS	6	May 12, 1919	20 years, 226 days	Olympia A.C., Philadelphia, Pennsylvania, US	
73	Win	11–0 (62)	Westside Jimmy Duffy	NWS	6	Apr 28, 1919	20 years, 212 days	Olympia A.C., Philadelphia, Pennsylvania, US	
72	Win	11–0 (61)	Joe Welling	NWS	8	Feb 26, 1919	20 years, 151 days	1st Regiment Armory, Newark, New Jersey, US	
71	Win	11–0 (60)	Larry Hansen	NWS	6	Feb 17, 1919	20 years, 142 days	Auditorium, Reading, Pennsylvania, US	
70	Win	11–0 (59)	Harlem Eddie Kelly	NWS	6	Feb 10, 1919	20 years, 135 days	Olympia A.C., Philadelphia, Pennsylvania, US	
69	Win	11–0 (58)	Ralph Brady	NWS	10	Feb 3, 1919	20 years, 128 days	Grand Opera House, Syracuse, New York, US	
68	Win	11–0 (57)	Young Abe Brown	NWS	6	Jan 20, 1919	20 years, 114 days	Olympia A.C., Philadelphia, Pennsylvania, US	
67	Win	11–0 (56)	Rocky Kansas	NWS	10	Jan 1, 1919	20 years, 95 days	Broadway Auditorium, Buffalo, New York, US	
66	Win	11–0 (55)	Ever Hammer	NWS	6	Dec 16, 1918	20 years, 79 days	Olympia A.C., Philadelphia, Pennsylvania, US	
65	Win	11–0 (54)	Frankie Callahan	TKO	9 (12)	Dec 10, 1918	20 years, 73 days	Armory, Boston, Massachusetts, US	
64	Win	10–0 (54)	Joe Welsh	NWS	6	Nov 23, 1918	20 years, 56 days	National A.C., Philadelphia, Pennsylvania, US	
63	Win	10–0 (53)	Frankie Callahan	NWS	6	Nov 2, 1918	20 years, 35 days	National A.C., Philadelphia, Pennsylvania, US	
62	Win	10–0 (52)	George K.O. Chaney	NWS	6	Sep 18, 1918	19 years, 355 days	National A.C., Philadelphia, Pennsylvania, US	
61	Win	10–0 (51)	Harvey Thorpe	NWS	6	Aug 26, 1918	19 years, 332 days	Olympia A.C., Philadelphia, Pennsylvania, US	
60	Win	10–0 (50)	Patsy Broderick	NWS	3	Jul 23, 1918	19 years, 298 days	Shibe Park, Philadelphia, Pennsylvania, US	
59	Win	10–0 (49)	Patsy Cline	NWS	6	Jul 16, 1918	19 years, 291 days	Shibe Park, Philadelphia, Pennsylvania, US	
58	Win	10–0 (48)	Frankie Callahan	NWS	8	Jul 6, 1918	19 years, 281 days	Atlantic City, New Jersey, US	
57	Win	10–0 (47)	Tommy Carey	NWS	3	Jun 26, 1918	19 years, 271 days	Service Club, Philadelphia, Pennsylvania, US	
56	Win	10–0 (46)	Vincent Pokorni	NWS	10	May 30, 1918	19 years, 244 days	League Park, Cleveland, Ohio, US	
55	Win	10–0 (45)	Phil Bloom	NWS	6	May 13, 1918	19 years, 227 days	Olympia A.C., Philadelphia, Pennsylvania, US	
54	Win	10–0 (44)	Willie Jackson	PTS	15	Apr 29, 1918	19 years, 213 days	Arena, New Haven, Connecticut, US	
53	Win	9–0 (44)	Frankie Britt	KO	3 (12)	Apr 23, 1918	19 years, 207 days	Armory, Boston, Massachusetts, US	
52	Win	8–0 (44)	Terry Brooks	NWS	6	Apr 20, 1918	19 years, 204 days	National A.C., Philadelphia, Pennsylvania, US	
51	Win	8–0 (43)	Patsy Cline	NWS	6	Apr 3, 1918	19 years, 187 days	Olympia A.C., Philadelphia, Pennsylvania, US	
50	Win	8–0 (42)	Eddie Wallace	NWS	6	Mar 25, 1918	19 years, 178 days	Olympia A.C., Philadelphia, Pennsylvania, US	
49	Win	8–0 (41)	Frankie Nelson	TKO	4 (10)	Mar 22, 1918	19 years, 175 days	Broadway Auditorium, Buffalo, New York, US	
48	Win	7–0 (41)	Pete Hartley	TKO	4 (6)	Mar 4, 1918	19 years, 157 days	Olympia A.C., Philadelphia, Pennsylvania, US	
47	Win	6–0 (41)	Tommy Touhey	KO	4 (6)	Feb 11, 1918	19 years, 136 days	Olympia A.C., Philadelphia, Pennsylvania, US	
46	Win	5–0 (41)	Frankie Callahan	NWS	6	Jan 21, 1918	19 years, 115 days	Olympia A.C., Philadelphia, Pennsylvania, US	
45	Win	5–0 (40)	Willie Jackson	NWS	6	Jan 7, 1918	19 years, 101 days	Olympia A.C., Philadelphia, Pennsylvania, US	
44	Win	5–0 (39)	Jack Russo	TKO	5 (12)	Dec 18, 1917	19 years, 81 days	Armory A.A., Boston, Massachusetts, US	
43	Win	4–0 (39)	Frankie McManus	NWS	6	Nov 29, 1917	19 years, 62 days	Olympia A.C., Philadelphia, Pennsylvania, US	
42	Win	4–0 (38)	Rocky Kansas	NWS	6	Oct 29, 1917	19 years, 31 days	Olympia A.C., Philadelphia, Pennsylvania, US	
41	Win	4–0 (37)	Frankie Britt	PTS	12	Oct 17, 1917	19 years, 19 days	Albaugh Theater, Baltimore, Maryland, US	
40	Win	3–0 (37)	Johnny Dundee	NWS	6	Oct 1, 1917	19 years, 3 days	Olympia A.C., Philadelphia, Pennsylvania, US	
39	Win	3–0 (36)	Young Terry McGovern	NWS	6	Aug 1, 1917	18 years, 307 days	Shibe Park, Philadelphia, Pennsylvania, US	
38	Win	3–0 (35)	Johnny Dundee	NWS	6	Mar 26, 1917	18 years, 179 days	Olympia A.C., Philadelphia, Pennsylvania, US	
37	Win	3–0 (34)	Artie Root	NWS	6	Feb 26, 1917	18 years, 151 days	Olympia A.C., Philadelphia, Pennsylvania, US	
36	Win	3–0 (33)	Texas Kid	PTS	10	Dec 14, 1916	18 years, 77 days	Holliday Street Theatre, Baltimore, Maryland, US	
35	Draw	2–0 (33)	Al Shubert	NWS	6	Nov 13, 1916	18 years, 46 days	Olympia A.C., Philadelphia, Pennsylvania, US	
34	Win	2–0 (32)	Dick Loadman	NWS	6	Oct 30, 1916	18 years, 32 days	Olympia A.C., Philadelphia, Pennsylvania, US	
33	Win	2–0 (31)	Al Shubert	NWS	6	May 29, 1916	17 years, 244 days	Olympia A.C., Philadelphia, Pennsylvania, US	
32	Win	2–0 (30)	Benny Kaufman	NWS	6	Apr 24, 1916	17 years, 209 days	Olympia A.C., Philadelphia, Pennsylvania, US	
31	Loss	2–0 (29)	Benny Kaufman	NWS	6	Apr 3, 1916	17 years, 188 days	Olympia A.C., Philadelphia, Pennsylvania, US	
30	Win	2–0 (28)	Pete Herman	NWS	6	Feb 28, 1916	17 years, 153 days	Olympia A.C., Philadelphia, Pennsylvania, US	
29	Draw	2–0 (27)	Eddie O'Keefe	NWS	6	Jan 31, 1916	17 years, 125 days	Olympia A.C., Philadelphia, Pennsylvania, US	
28	Loss	2–0 (26)	Eddie O'Keefe	NWS	6	Jan 24, 1916	17 years, 118 days	Olympia A.C., Philadelphia, Pennsylvania, US	
27	Win	2–0 (25)	Willy Brown	NWS	6	Jan 1, 1916	17 years, 95 days	Olympia A.C., Philadelphia, Pennsylvania, US	
26	Win	2–0 (24)	Kid Goodman	NWS	6	Dec 6, 1915	17 years, 69 days	Olympia A.C., Philadelphia, Pennsylvania, US	
25	Win	2–0 (23)	Young Jack Toland	NWS	6	Oct 19, 1915	17 years, 21 days	Douglas A.C., Philadelphia, Pennsylvania, US	
24	ND	2–0 (22)	Johnny Solzberg	ND	6	Oct 1, 1915	17 years, 3 days	Location unknown	
23	Win	2–0 (21)	Battling Reddy	NWS	6	Sep 24, 1915	16 years, 361 days	National A.C., Philadelphia, Pennsylvania, US	
22	Win	2–0 (20)	Willie Mack	NWS	6	Jun 24, 1915	16 years, 269 days	Broadway A.C., Philadelphia, Pennsylvania, US	
21	Win	2–0 (19)	Louisiana	NWS	6	May 24, 1915	16 years, 238 days	Olympia A.C., Philadelphia, Pennsylvania, US	
20	Win	2–0 (18)	Willie Mack	NWS	6	May 3, 1915	16 years, 217 days	Olympia A.C., Philadelphia, Pennsylvania, US	
19	Win	2–0 (17)	Willie Mack	NWS	6	Apr 19, 1915	16 years, 203 days	Olympia A.C., Philadelphia, Pennsylvania, US	
18	Win	2–0 (16)	Barney Snyder	NWS	6	Apr 12, 1915	16 years, 196 days	Olympia A.C., Philadelphia, Pennsylvania, US	
17	Win	2–0 (15)	Jimmy Murray	NWS	6	Mar 22, 1915	16 years, 175 days	Olympia A.C., Philadelphia, Pennsylvania, US	
16	Win	2–0 (14)	Young Freddie Diggins	TKO	4 (6)	Mar 8, 1915	16 years, 161 days	Olympia A.C., Philadelphia, Pennsylvania, US	
15	Win	1–0 (14)	Kid Goodman	NWS	6	Jan 9, 1915	16 years, 109 days	National A.C., Philadelphia, Pennsylvania, US	
14	Win	1–0 (13)	Pinky Burns	NWS	6	Dec 12, 1914	16 years, 75 days	National A.C., Philadelphia, Pennsylvania, US	
13	Win	1–0 (12)	Freddie Haefling	TKO	4 (6)	Dec 5, 1914	16 years, 68 days	National A.C., Philadelphia, Pennsylvania, US	
12	Loss	0–0 (12)	Young Terry McGovern	NWS	6	Sep 12, 1914	15 years, 349 days	National A.C., Philadelphia, Pennsylvania, US	
11	Loss	0–0 (11)	Young Terry McGovern	NWS	6	Aug 31, 1914	15 years, 337 days	Olympia A.C., Philadelphia, Pennsylvania, US	
10	Draw	0–0 (10)	Mickey Brown	NWS	6	Jul 23, 1914	15 years, 298 days	Broadway A.C., Philadelphia, Pennsylvania, US	
9	Draw	0–0 (9)	Neil McCue	NWS	6	Jun 11, 1914	15 years, 256 days	Broadway A.C., Philadelphia, Pennsylvania, US	
8	Win	0–0 (8)	Mickey Brown	NWS	6	May 25, 1914	15 years, 239 days	Olympia A.C., Philadelphia, Pennsylvania, US	
7	Win	0–0 (7)	Kid Goodman	NWS	6	May 4, 1914	15 years, 218 days	Olympia A.C., Philadelphia, Pennsylvania, US	
6	Win	0–0 (6)	Neil McCue	NWS	6	Apr 13, 1914	15 years, 197 days	Olympia A.C., Philadelphia, Pennsylvania, US	
5	Win	0–0 (5)	Benny Reilly	NWS	6	Mar 30, 1914	15 years, 183 days	Olympia A.C., Philadelphia, Pennsylvania, US	
4	Win	0–0 (4)	Bobby Woods	NWS	6	Mar 16, 1914	15 years, 169 days	Olympia A.C., Philadelphia, Pennsylvania, US	
3	Win	0–0 (3)	Kid Burns	NWS	6	Feb 19, 1914	15 years, 144 days	Broadway A.C., Philadelphia, Pennsylvania, US	
2	Win	0–0 (2)	Johnny McLaughlin	NWS	6	Jan 22, 1914	15 years, 116 days	Broadway A.C., Philadelphia, Pennsylvania, US	
1	Win	0–0 (1)	Mickey Brown	NWS	6	Nov 6, 1913	15 years, 39 days	Broadway A.C., Philadelphia, Pennsylvania, US	

=== Unofficial record ===
171 fights	145 wins	16 losses
By knockout	38	1
By decision	107	12
By disqualification	0	3
Draws	8	
No contests	2	

Record with the inclusion of newspaper decisions in the win/loss/draw column.

No.	Result	Record	Opponent	Type	Round	Date	Age	Location	Notes
171	Win	145–16–8 (2)	Nate Goldman	TKO	5 (10)	Jun 18, 1928	29 years, 264 days	Shibe Park, Philadelphia, Pennsylvania, US	
170	Loss	144–16–8 (2)	Ace Hudkins	UD	10	Jan 20, 1928	29 years, 114 days	Madison Square Garden, New York City, New York, US	
169	Win	144–15–8 (2)	Jack McFarland	TKO	8 (12)	Jan 2, 1928	29 years, 96 days	Arena, Philadelphia, Pennsylvania, US	
168	Win	143–15–8 (2)	Hilario Martinez	SD	10	Dec 12, 1927	29 years, 75 days	Arena, Philadelphia, Pennsylvania, US	
167	Win	142–15–8 (2)	Vincent Forgione	PTS	10	Nov 7, 1927	29 years, 40 days	Arena, Philadelphia, Pennsylvania, US	
166	Win	141–15–8 (2)	Pat Haley	KO	1 (8)	Oct 3, 1927	29 years, 5 days	Arena, Philadelphia, Pennsylvania, US	
165	Win	140–15–8 (2)	Sailor Darden	PTS	10	Sep 12, 1927	28 years, 349 days	Sesquicentennial Stadium, Philadelphia, Pennsylvania, US	
164	Win	139–15–8 (2)	Willie Greb	KO	4 (10)	Aug 30, 1927	28 years, 336 days	Carnival Park, West Manayunk, Pennsylvania, US	
163	Win	138–15–8 (2)	Danny Gordon	KO	8 (10)	Aug 9, 1927	28 years, 193 days	Carnival Park, West Manayunk, Pennsylvania, US	
162	Loss	137–15–8 (2)	Ace Hudkins	PTS	10	Apr 12, 1927	28 years, 196 days	Olympic Auditorium, Los Angeles, California, US	
161	Win	137–14–8 (2)	Young Harry Wills	TKO	8 (10)	Mar 15, 1927	28 years, 168 days	Olympic Auditorium, Los Angeles, California, US	
160	Loss	136–14–8 (2)	Tommy Jordan	DQ	4 (10)	Nov 1, 1926	28 years, 34 days	Broadway Arena, New York City, New York, US	Jordan claimed to be fouled when dropped by a body shot Referee agreed
159	Win	136–13–8 (2)	Farmer Joe Cooper	PTS	10	Oct 15, 1926	28 years, 17 days	Madison Square Garden, New York City, New York, US	
158	Win	135–13–8 (2)	Danny Gordon	PTS	10	Oct 4, 1926	28 years, 6 days	Carnival Park, West Manayunk, Pennsylvania, US	
157	Win	134–13–8 (2)	Al Conway	NWS	6	Sep 15, 1926	27 years, 352 days	Airport, Atlantic City, New Jersey, US	
156	Win	133–13–8 (2)	Joe Reno	PTS	10	Sep 1, 1926	27 years, 338 days	Shibe Park, Philadelphia, Pennsylvania, US	
155	Win	132–13–8 (2)	Mickey Forkins	TKO	5 (?)	Jul 29, 1926	27 years, 304 days	Madison Square Garden, New York City, New York, US	
154	Win	131–13–8 (2)	Joe Reno	PTS	10	Jul 12, 1926	27 years, 287 days	Shibe Park, Philadelphia, Pennsylvania, US	
153	Loss	130–13–8 (2)	Meyer Cohen	PTS	10	Jun 28, 1926	27 years, 273 days	Hurley Stadium, Hartford, Connecticut, US	
152	Win	130–12–8 (2)	Georgie Russell	TKO	6 (8)	Jun 25, 1926	27 years, 270 days	Bacharach Ball Park, Atlantic City, New Jersey, US	
151	Win	129–12–8 (2)	Basil Galiano	PTS	10	May 28, 1926	27 years, 242 days	Coney Island Stadium, New York City, New York, US	
150	Win	128–12–8 (2)	Don Boyer	TKO	6 (12)	May 19, 1926	27 years, 233 days	Armory, Toledo, Ohio, US	
149	Win	127–12–8 (2)	Jack McFarland	NWS	10	May 3, 1926	27 years, 217 days	Laurel Garden, Newark, New Jersey, US	
148	Draw	126–12–8 (2)	Joe Reno	NWS	8	Apr 19, 1926	27 years, 203 days	Waltz Dream Arena, Atlantic City, New Jersey, US	
147	Draw	126–12–7 (2)	Joe Dundee	PTS	10	Jul 16, 1925	26 years, 291 days	Shibe Park, Philadelphia, Pennsylvania, US	
146	Win	126–12–6 (2)	Jack Zivic	UD	10	Jun 8, 1925	26 years, 253 days	Shibe Park, Philadelphia, Pennsylvania, US	
145	Win	125–12–6 (2)	Tony Julian	TKO	3 (10)	Apr 6, 1925	26 years, 190 days	Arena, Philadelphia, Pennsylvania, US	
144	Win	124–12–6 (2)	Nate Goldman	TKO	5 (10)	Mar 16, 1925	26 years, 169 days	Arena, Philadelphia, Pennsylvania, US	
143	Win	123–12–6 (2)	Joe Reno	TKO	5 (10)	Feb 23, 1925	26 years, 148 days	Arena, Philadelphia, Pennsylvania, US	
142	Loss	122–12–6 (2)	Jack Zivic	TKO	5 (10)	Jan 19, 1925	26 years, 113 days	Motor Square Garden, Pittsburgh, Pennsylvania, US	
141	Win	122–11–6 (2)	Joe Tiplitz	PTS	10	Dec 25, 1924	26 years, 88 days	108th Field Artillery Armory, Philadelphia, Pennsylvania, US	
140	Win	121–11–6 (2)	Joe Libby	PTS	10	Nov 24, 1924	26 years, 57 days	108th Field Artillery Armory, Philadelphia, Pennsylvania, US	
139	Win	120–11–6 (2)	K.O. Mars	NWS	10	Aug 18, 1924	25 years, 325 days	Redland Field, Cincinnati, Ohio, US	
138	Draw	119–11–6 (2)	Bobby Barrett	MD	10	Jul 21, 1924	25 years, 297 days	Shibe Park, Philadelphia, Pennsylvania, US	
137	Loss	119–11–5 (2)	Mickey Walker	UD	10	Jun 2, 1924	25 years, 248 days	Shibe Park, Philadelphia, Pennsylvania, US	For NYSAC, NBA, and The Ring welterweight titles
136	Win	119–10–5 (2)	Sailor Friedman	PTS	10	Apr 15, 1924	25 years, 200 days	Mechanics Building, Boston, Massachusetts, US	
135	Win	118–10–5 (2)	Ted Marchant	TKO	4 (10)	Mar 17, 1924	25 years, 171 days	Arena, Philadelphia, Pennsylvania, US	
134	Win	117–10–5 (2)	Pinky Mitchell	NWS	10	Feb 18, 1924	25 years, 143 days	Auditorium, Milwaukee, Wisconsin, US	
133	Win	116–10–5 (2)	Ray Mitchell	PTS	10	Jan 28, 1924	25 years, 122 days	Arena, Philadelphia, Pennsylvania, US	
132	Loss	115–10–5 (2)	Nate Goldman	PTS	10	Jan 1, 1924	25 years, 95 days	Arena, Philadelphia, Pennsylvania, US	
131	Win	115–9–5 (2)	Pep O'Brien	UD	10	Dec 28, 1923	25 years, 91 days	109th Infantry Armory, Scranton, Pennsylvania, US	
130	Win	114–9–5 (2)	Jack Palmer	NWS	8	Nov 19, 1923	25 years, 52 days	Arena, Philadelphia, Pennsylvania, US	
129	Loss	113–9–5 (2)	Benny Leonard	UD	15	Jul 23, 1923	24 years, 298 days	Yankee Stadium, New York City, New York, US	For NYSAC and NBA lightweight titles
128	Win	113–8–5 (2)	Tim Droney	NWS	10	Jun 25, 1923	24 years, 270 days	Midway Arena, Allentown, Pennsylvania, US	
127	Win	112–8–5 (2)	Pal Moran	NWS	8	Jun 18, 1923	24 years, 263 days	Shibe Park, Philadelphia, Pennsylvania, US	
126	Win	111–8–5 (2)	Jack Lawler	TKO	5 (8)	Jan 29, 1923	24 years, 123 days	Arena, Philadelphia, Pennsylvania, US	
125	Win	110–8–5 (2)	Pal Moran	PTS	15	Jan 19, 1923	24 years, 113 days	Madison Square Garden, New York City, New York, US	
124	Win	109–8–5 (2)	Johnny Mendelsohn	NWS	10	Nov 3, 1922	24 years, 36 days	Auditorium, Milwaukee, Wisconsin, US	
123	Win	108–8–5 (2)	Ever Hammer	NWS	8	Sep 11, 1922	23 years, 348 days	Shibe Park, Philadelphia, Pennsylvania, US	
122	Loss	107–8–5 (2)	Benny Leonard	NWS	12	Jul 27, 1922	23 years, 302 days	Boyle's Thirty Acres, Jersey City, New Jersey, US	NYSAC and NBA lightweight titles at stake; (via KO only)
121	Win	107–7–5 (2)	Bobby Barrett	TKO	7 (8)	Jun 6, 1922	23 years, 251 days	Shibe Park, Philadelphia, Pennsylvania, US	
120	Win	106–7–5 (2)	Johnny Dundee	UD	15	May 5, 1922	23 years, 219 days	Madison Square Garden, New York City, New York, US	
119	Win	105–7–5 (2)	Tim Droney	NWS	8	Apr 17, 1922	23 years, 201 days	Olympia A.C., Philadelphia, Pennsylvania, US	
118	Loss	104–7–5 (2)	Charley Pitts	DQ	7 (12)	Apr 10, 1922	23 years, 194 days	Broadway Arena, New York City, New York, US	
117	Win	104–6–5 (2)	Alex Hart	NWS	8	Mar 13, 1922	23 years, 166 days	Olympia A.C., Philadelphia, Pennsylvania, US	
116	Win	103–6–5 (2)	Johnny Sheppard	KO	3 (12)	Mar 11, 1922	23 years, 164 days	Clermont Avenue Rink, New York City, New York, US	
115	Win	102–6–5 (2)	Oakland Jimmy Duffy	TKO	8 (12)	Feb 24, 1922	23 years, 149 days	Madison Square Garden, New York City, New York, US	Duffy refused to fight after claiming he was fouled. The referee disagreed with this claim
114	NC	101–6–5 (2)	Mel Coogan	NC	1 (8)	Feb 1, 1922	23 years, 126 days	Olympia A.C., Philadelphia, Pennsylvania, US	NC after an accidental head clash and Coogan could not continue
113	Win	101–6–5 (1)	Barney Adair	NWS	8	Jan 2, 1922	23 years, 96 days	Olympia A.C., Philadelphia, Pennsylvania, US	
112	Win	100–6–5 (1)	Sailor Friedman	PTS	15	Dec 16, 1921	23 years, 79 days	Madison Square Garden, New York City, New York, US	
111	Win	99–6–5 (1)	Manuel Azevedo	TKO	2 (8)	Nov 24, 1921	23 years, 57 days	Olympia A.C., Philadelphia, Pennsylvania, US	
110	Loss	98–6–5 (1)	Rocky Kansas	PTS	15	Oct 21, 1921	23 years, 23 days	Madison Square Garden, New York City, New York, US	
109	Win	98–5–5 (1)	Sailor Friedman	NWS	8	Sep 13, 1921	22 years, 350 days	Shibe Park, Philadelphia, Pennsylvania, US	
108	Win	97–5–5 (1)	Sailor Friedman	NWS	8	Aug 24, 1921	22 years, 330 days	Shibe Park, Philadelphia, Pennsylvania, US	
107	Win	96–5–5 (1)	Tim Droney	NWS	8	Jul 4, 1921	22 years, 279 days	Lauer's Park, Reading, Pennsylvania, US	
106	Win	95–5–5 (1)	Sailor Friedman	NWS	10	Feb 28, 1921	22 years, 153 days	Auditorium, Milwaukee, Wisconsin, US	
105	Win	94–5–5 (1)	Willie Jackson	NWS	10	Jan 26, 1921	22 years, 120 days	Auditorium, Milwaukee, Wisconsin, US	
104	Win	93–5–5 (1)	Otto Wallace	TKO	4 (8)	Jan 1, 1921	22 years, 95 days	Olympia A.C., Philadelphia, Pennsylvania, US	
103	Win	92–5–5 (1)	Chick Simler	TKO	7 (8)	Dec 25, 1920	22 years, 88 days	Olympia A.C., Philadelphia, Pennsylvania, US	
102	Win	91–5–5 (1)	Johnny Tillman	NWS	8	Nov 25, 1920	22 years, 58 days	National A.C., Philadelphia, Pennsylvania, US	
101	Win	90–5–5 (1)	Harlem Eddie Kelly	KO	5 (8)	Nov 8, 1920	22 years, 41 days	Olympia A.C., Philadelphia, Pennsylvania, US	
100	Win	89–5–5 (1)	Joe Welling	NWS	10	Oct 26, 1920	22 years, 28 days	Auditorium, Milwaukee, Wisconsin, US	
99	Win	88–5–5 (1)	Frankie Callahan	TKO	5 (12)	Sep 18, 1920	21 years, 356 days	Lawrence, Massachusetts, US	
98	Win	87–5–5 (1)	Willie Jackson	NWS	8	Jul 12, 1920	21 years, 288 days	Shibe Park, Philadelphia, Pennsylvania, US	
97	Win	86–5–5 (1)	Richie Mitchell	NWS	10	Jun 9, 1920	21 years, 255 days	Auditorium, Milwaukee, Wisconsin, US	
96	Draw	85–5–5 (1)	Eddie Fitzsimmons	NWS	8	May 24, 1920	21 years, 239 days	Shibe Park, Philadelphia, Pennsylvania, US	
95	Win	85–5–4 (1)	Pinky Mitchell	NWS	10	May 19, 1920	21 years, 234 days	Auditorium, Milwaukee, Wisconsin, US	
94	Win	84–5–4 (1)	Georges Papin	KO	6 (12)	May 12, 1920	21 years, 227 days	4th Regiment Armory, Jersey City, New Jersey, US	
93	Win	83–5–4 (1)	Johnny Tillman	NWS	10	May 3, 1920	21 years, 218 days	Auditorium, Saint Paul, Minnesota, US	
92	Win	82–5–4 (1)	Banty Sharpe	KO	5 (8)	Apr 19, 1920	21 years, 204 days	Lyceum Theatre, Paterson, New Jersey, US	
91	Win	81–5–4 (1)	Tim Droney	NWS	6	Apr 5, 1920	21 years, 190 days	Fulton Opera House, Lancaster, Pennsylvania, US	
90	Win	80–5–4 (1)	Stanley Hinckle	TKO	6 (6)	Mar 29, 1920	21 years, 183 days	Olympia A.C., Philadelphia, Pennsylvania, US	
89	Win	79–5–4 (1)	Johnny Martin	NWS	6	Mar 20, 1920	21 years, 174 days	National A.C., Philadelphia, Pennsylvania, US	
88	Win	78–5–4 (1)	Johnny Rose	NWS	6	Mar 15, 1920	21 years, 169 days	Olympia A.C., Philadelphia, Pennsylvania, US	
87	Win	77–5–4 (1)	Dick DeSanders	KO	3 (6)	Feb 28, 1920	21 years, 153 days	National A.C., Philadelphia, Pennsylvania, US	
86	Win	76–5–4 (1)	Allentown Dundee	KO	2 (6), 1:20	Feb 23, 1920	21 years, 148 days	Olympia A.C., Philadelphia, Pennsylvania, US	
85	Win	75–5–4 (1)	Johnny Noye	TKO	2 (6)	Nov 27, 1919	21 years, 60 days	National A.C., Philadelphia, Pennsylvania, US	
84	Win	74–5–4 (1)	Charley Pitts	NWS	6	Nov 22, 1919	21 years, 55 days	National A.C., Philadelphia, Pennsylvania, US	
83	Win	73–5–4 (1)	Young George Erne	KO	2 (6)	Nov 8, 1919	21 years, 41 days	National A.C., Philadelphia, Pennsylvania, US	
82	Win	72–5–4 (1)	Harvey Thorpe	NWS	10	Oct 27, 1919	21 years, 29 days	Detroit, Michigan, US	
81	Loss	71–5–4 (1)	Johnny Noye	DQ	3 (12)	Oct 21, 1919	21 years, 23 days	Stockyards Stadium, Denver, Colorado, US	
80	Win	71–4–4 (1)	Stanley Yoakum	TKO	4 (12)	Oct 10, 1919	21 years, 12 days	Stockyards Stadium, Denver, Colorado, US	
79	Win	70–4–4 (1)	Willie Jackson	NWS	6	Aug 4, 1919	20 years, 310 days	Shibe Park, Philadelphia, Pennsylvania, US	
78	Win	69–4–4 (1)	Joe Welling	NWS	6	Jul 14, 1919	20 years, 289 days	Shibe Park, Philadelphia, Pennsylvania, US	
77	Win	68–4–4 (1)	Packy Hommey	NWS	8	Jun 13, 1919	20 years, 258 days	Pennsgrove, New Jersey, US	
76	Win	67–4–4 (1)	George K.O. Chaney	KO	1 (6), 1:12	Jun 4, 1919	20 years, 249 days	Shibe Park, Philadelphia, Pennsylvania, US	
75	Win	66–4–4 (1)	Al Murphy	NWS	10	May 13, 1919	20 years, 227 days	Nesbitt Theatre, Wilkes-Barre, Pennsylvania, US	
74	Win	65–4–4 (1)	Cal Delaney	NWS	6	May 12, 1919	20 years, 226 days	Olympia A.C., Philadelphia, Pennsylvania, US	
73	Win	64–4–4 (1)	Westside Jimmy Duffy	NWS	6	Apr 28, 1919	20 years, 212 days	Olympia A.C., Philadelphia, Pennsylvania, US	
72	Win	63–4–4 (1)	Joe Welling	NWS	8	Feb 26, 1919	20 years, 151 days	1st Regiment Armory, Newark, New Jersey, US	
71	Win	62–4–4 (1)	Larry Hansen	NWS	6	Feb 17, 1919	20 years, 142 days	Auditorium, Reading, Pennsylvania, US	
70	Win	61–4–4 (1)	Harlem Eddie Kelly	NWS	6	Feb 10, 1919	20 years, 135 days	Olympia A.C., Philadelphia, Pennsylvania, US	
69	Win	60–4–4 (1)	Ralph Brady	NWS	10	Feb 3, 1919	20 years, 128 days	Grand Opera House, Syracuse, New York, US	
68	Win	59–4–4 (1)	Young Abe Brown	NWS	6	Jan 20, 1919	20 years, 114 days	Olympia A.C., Philadelphia, Pennsylvania, US	
67	Win	58–4–4 (1)	Rocky Kansas	NWS	10	Jan 1, 1919	20 years, 95 days	Broadway Auditorium, Buffalo, New York, US	
66	Win	57–4–4 (1)	Ever Hammer	NWS	6	Dec 16, 1918	20 years, 79 days	Olympia A.C., Philadelphia, Pennsylvania, US	
65	Win	56–4–4 (1)	Frankie Callahan	TKO	9 (12)	Dec 10, 1918	20 years, 73 days	Armory, Boston, Massachusetts, US	
64	Win	55–4–4 (1)	Joe Welsh	NWS	6	Nov 23, 1918	20 years, 56 days	National A.C., Philadelphia, Pennsylvania, US	
63	Win	54–4–4 (1)	Frankie Callahan	NWS	6	Nov 2, 1918	20 years, 35 days	National A.C., Philadelphia, Pennsylvania, US	
62	Win	53–4–4 (1)	George K.O. Chaney	NWS	6	Sep 18, 1918	19 years, 355 days	National A.C., Philadelphia, Pennsylvania, US	
61	Win	52–4–4 (1)	Harvey Thorpe	NWS	6	Aug 26, 1918	19 years, 332 days	Olympia A.C., Philadelphia, Pennsylvania, US	
60	Win	51–4–4 (1)	Patsy Broderick	NWS	3	Jul 23, 1918	19 years, 298 days	Shibe Park, Philadelphia, Pennsylvania, US	
59	Win	50–4–4 (1)	Patsy Cline	NWS	6	Jul 16, 1918	19 years, 291 days	Shibe Park, Philadelphia, Pennsylvania, US	
58	Win	49–4–4 (1)	Frankie Callahan	NWS	8	Jul 6, 1918	19 years, 281 days	Atlantic City, New Jersey, US	
57	Win	48–4–4 (1)	Tommy Carey	NWS	3	Jun 26, 1918	19 years, 271 days	Service Club, Philadelphia, Pennsylvania, US	
56	Win	47–4–4 (1)	Vincent Pokorni	NWS	10	May 30, 1918	19 years, 244 days	League Park, Cleveland, Ohio, US	
55	Win	46–4–4 (1)	Phil Bloom	NWS	6	May 13, 1918	19 years, 227 days	Olympia A.C., Philadelphia, Pennsylvania, US	
54	Win	45–4–4 (1)	Willie Jackson	PTS	15	Apr 29, 1918	19 years, 213 days	Arena, New Haven, Connecticut, US	
53	Win	44–4–4 (1)	Frankie Britt	KO	3 (12)	Apr 23, 1918	19 years, 207 days	Armory, Boston, Massachusetts, US	
52	Win	43–4–4 (1)	Terry Brooks	NWS	6	Apr 20, 1918	19 years, 204 days	National A.C., Philadelphia, Pennsylvania, US	
51	Win	42–4–4 (1)	Patsy Cline	NWS	6	Apr 3, 1918	19 years, 187 days	Olympia A.C., Philadelphia, Pennsylvania, US	
50	Win	41–4–4 (1)	Eddie Wallace	NWS	6	Mar 25, 1918	19 years, 178 days	Olympia A.C., Philadelphia, Pennsylvania, US	
49	Win	40–4–4 (1)	Frankie Nelson	TKO	4 (10)	Mar 22, 1918	19 years, 175 days	Broadway Auditorium, Buffalo, New York, US	
48	Win	39–4–4 (1)	Pete Hartley	TKO	4 (6)	Mar 4, 1918	19 years, 157 days	Olympia A.C., Philadelphia, Pennsylvania, US	
47	Win	38–4–4 (1)	Tommy Touhey	KO	4 (6)	Feb 11, 1918	19 years, 136 days	Olympia A.C., Philadelphia, Pennsylvania, US	
46	Win	37–4–4 (1)	Frankie Callahan	NWS	6	Jan 21, 1918	19 years, 115 days	Olympia A.C., Philadelphia, Pennsylvania, US	
45	Win	36–4–4 (1)	Willie Jackson	NWS	6	Jan 7, 1918	19 years, 101 days	Olympia A.C., Philadelphia, Pennsylvania, US	
44	Win	35–4–4 (1)	Jack Russo	TKO	5 (12)	Dec 18, 1917	19 years, 81 days	Armory A.A., Boston, Massachusetts, US	
43	Win	34–4–4 (1)	Frankie McManus	NWS	6	Nov 29, 1917	19 years, 62 days	Olympia A.C., Philadelphia, Pennsylvania, US	
42	Win	33–4–4 (1)	Rocky Kansas	NWS	6	Oct 29, 1917	19 years, 31 days	Olympia A.C., Philadelphia, Pennsylvania, US	
41	Win	32–4–4 (1)	Frankie Britt	PTS	12	Oct 17, 1917	19 years, 19 days	Albaugh Theater, Baltimore, Maryland, US	
40	Win	31–4–4 (1)	Johnny Dundee	NWS	6	Oct 1, 1917	19 years, 3 days	Olympia A.C., Philadelphia, Pennsylvania, US	
39	Win	30–4–4 (1)	Young Terry McGovern	NWS	6	Aug 1, 1917	18 years, 307 days	Shibe Park, Philadelphia, Pennsylvania, US	
38	Win	29–4–4 (1)	Johnny Dundee	NWS	6	Mar 26, 1917	18 years, 179 days	Olympia A.C., Philadelphia, Pennsylvania, US	
37	Win	28–4–4 (1)	Artie Root	NWS	6	Feb 26, 1917	18 years, 151 days	Olympia A.C., Philadelphia, Pennsylvania, US	
36	Win	27–4–4 (1)	Texas Kid	PTS	10	Dec 14, 1916	18 years, 77 days	Holliday Street Theatre, Baltimore, Maryland, US	
35	Draw	26–4–4 (1)	Al Shubert	NWS	6	Nov 13, 1916	18 years, 46 days	Olympia A.C., Philadelphia, Pennsylvania, US	
34	Win	26–4–3 (1)	Dick Loadman	NWS	6	Oct 30, 1916	18 years, 32 days	Olympia A.C., Philadelphia, Pennsylvania, US	
33	Win	25–4–3 (1)	Al Shubert	NWS	6	May 29, 1916	17 years, 244 days	Olympia A.C., Philadelphia, Pennsylvania, US	
32	Win	24–4–3 (1)	Benny Kaufman	NWS	6	Apr 24, 1916	17 years, 209 days	Olympia A.C., Philadelphia, Pennsylvania, US	
31	Loss	23–4–3 (1)	Benny Kaufman	NWS	6	Apr 3, 1916	17 years, 188 days	Olympia A.C., Philadelphia, Pennsylvania, US	
30	Win	23–3–3 (1)	Pete Herman	NWS	6	Feb 28, 1916	17 years, 153 days	Olympia A.C., Philadelphia, Pennsylvania, US	
29	Draw	22–3–3 (1)	Eddie O'Keefe	NWS	6	Jan 31, 1916	17 years, 125 days	Olympia A.C., Philadelphia, Pennsylvania, US	
28	Loss	22–3–2 (1)	Eddie O'Keefe	NWS	6	Jan 24, 1916	17 years, 118 days	Olympia A.C., Philadelphia, Pennsylvania, US	
27	Win	22–2–2 (1)	Willy Brown	NWS	6	Jan 1, 1916	17 years, 95 days	Olympia A.C., Philadelphia, Pennsylvania, US	
26	Win	21–2–2 (1)	Kid Goodman	NWS	6	Dec 6, 1915	17 years, 69 days	Olympia A.C., Philadelphia, Pennsylvania, US	
25	Win	20–2–2 (1)	Young Jack Toland	NWS	6	Oct 19, 1915	17 years, 21 days	Douglas A.C., Philadelphia, Pennsylvania, US	
24	ND	19–2–2 (1)	Johnny Solzberg	ND	6	Oct 1, 1915	17 years, 3 days	Location unknown	
23	Win	19–2–2	Battling Reddy	NWS	6	Sep 24, 1915	16 years, 361 days	National A.C., Philadelphia, Pennsylvania, US	
22	Win	18–2–2	Willie Mack	NWS	6	Jun 24, 1915	16 years, 269 days	Broadway A.C., Philadelphia, Pennsylvania, US	
21	Win	17–2–2	Louisiana	NWS	6	May 24, 1915	16 years, 238 days	Olympia A.C., Philadelphia, Pennsylvania, US	
20	Win	16–2–2	Willie Mack	NWS	6	May 3, 1915	16 years, 217 days	Olympia A.C., Philadelphia, Pennsylvania, US	
19	Win	15–2–2	Willie Mack	NWS	6	Apr 19, 1915	16 years, 203 days	Olympia A.C., Philadelphia, Pennsylvania, US	
18	Win	14–2–2	Barney Snyder	NWS	6	Apr 12, 1915	16 years, 196 days	Olympia A.C., Philadelphia, Pennsylvania, US	
17	Win	13–2–2	Jimmy Murray	NWS	6	Mar 22, 1915	16 years, 175 days	Olympia A.C., Philadelphia, Pennsylvania, US	
16	Win	12–2–2	Young Freddie Diggins	TKO	4 (6)	Mar 8, 1915	16 years, 161 days	Olympia A.C., Philadelphia, Pennsylvania, US	
15	Win	11–2–2	Kid Goodman	NWS	6	Jan 9, 1915	16 years, 109 days	National A.C., Philadelphia, Pennsylvania, US	
14	Win	10–2–2	Pinky Burns	NWS	6	Dec 12, 1914	16 years, 75 days	National A.C., Philadelphia, Pennsylvania, US	
13	Win	9–2–2	Freddie Haefling	TKO	4 (6)	Dec 5, 1914	16 years, 68 days	National A.C., Philadelphia, Pennsylvania, US	
12	Loss	8–2–2	Young Terry McGovern	NWS	6	Sep 12, 1914	15 years, 349 days	National A.C., Philadelphia, Pennsylvania, US	
11	Loss	8–1–2	Young Terry McGovern	NWS	6	Aug 31, 1914	15 years, 337 days	Olympia A.C., Philadelphia, Pennsylvania, US	
10	Draw	8–0–2	Mickey Brown	NWS	6	Jul 23, 1914	15 years, 298 days	Broadway A.C., Philadelphia, Pennsylvania, US	
9	Draw	8–0–1	Neil McCue	NWS	6	Jun 11, 1914	15 years, 256 days	Broadway A.C., Philadelphia, Pennsylvania, US	
8	Win	8–0	Mickey Brown	NWS	6	May 25, 1914	15 years, 239 days	Olympia A.C., Philadelphia, Pennsylvania, US	
7	Win	7–0	Kid Goodman	NWS	6	May 4, 1914	15 years, 218 days	Olympia A.C., Philadelphia, Pennsylvania, US	
6	Win	6–0	Neil McCue	NWS	6	Apr 13, 1914	15 years, 197 days	Olympia A.C., Philadelphia, Pennsylvania, US	
5	Win	5–0	Benny Reilly	NWS	6	Mar 30, 1914	15 years, 183 days	Olympia A.C., Philadelphia, Pennsylvania, US	
4	Win	4–0	Bobby Woods	NWS	6	Mar 16, 1914	15 years, 169 days	Olympia A.C., Philadelphia, Pennsylvania, US	
3	Win	3–0	Kid Burns	NWS	6	Feb 19, 1914	15 years, 144 days	Broadway A.C., Philadelphia, Pennsylvania, US	
2	Win	2–0	Johnny McLaughlin	NWS	6	Jan 22, 1914	15 years, 116 days	Broadway A.C., Philadelphia, Pennsylvania, US	
1	Win	1–0	Mickey Brown	NWS	6	Nov 6, 1913	15 years, 39 days	Broadway A.C., Philadelphia, Pennsylvania, US	

== See also ==
- List of select Jewish boxers
