= George Chaney =

American boxer (1892–1958)

George "K.O." Chaney
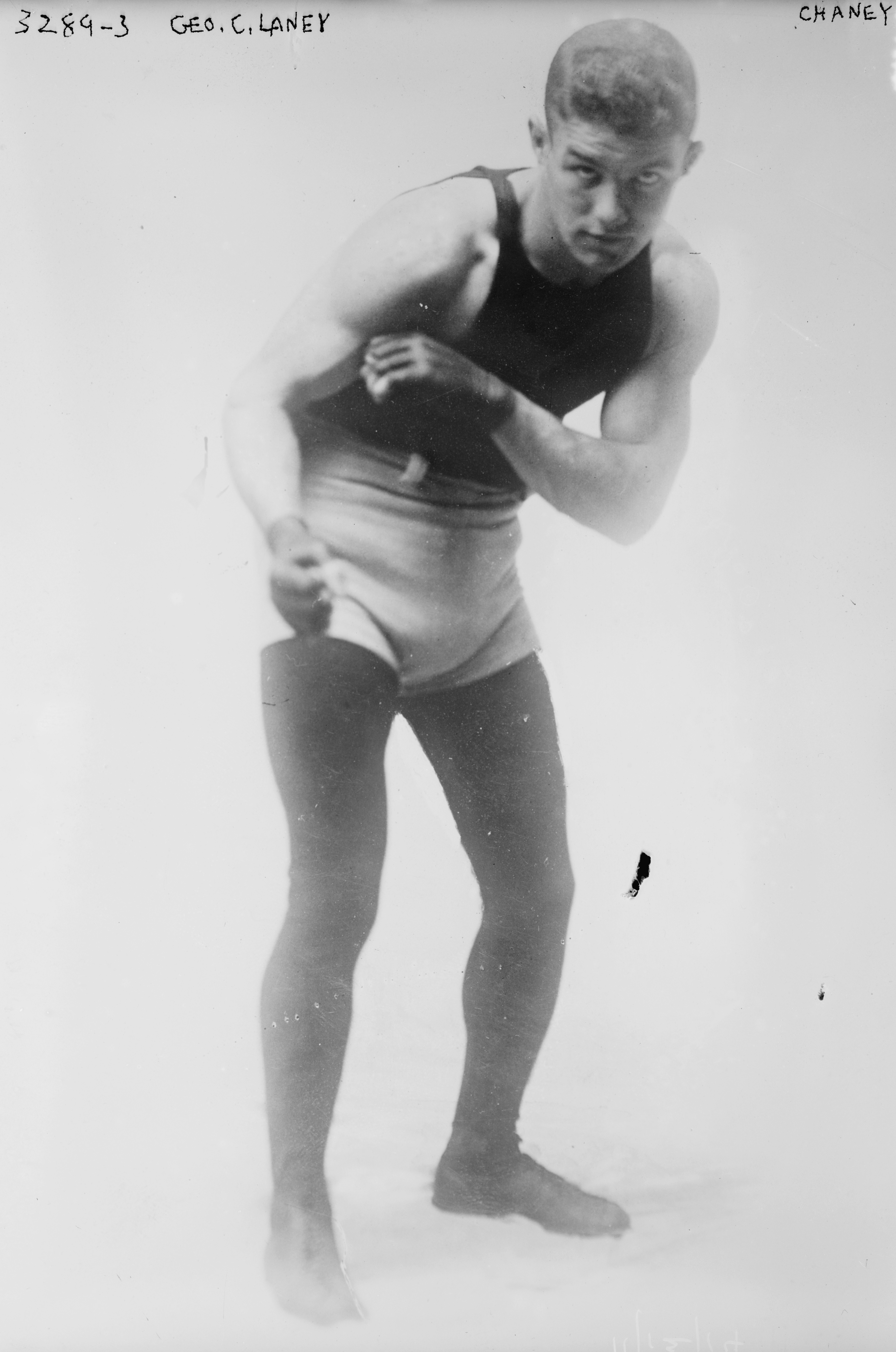

Personal information
- Nickname: Knockout King of Fistiana
- Nationality: American
- Born: George Henry Chaney; April 16, 1892 Baltimore, Maryland
- Died: December 20, 1958 (aged 66)
- Weight: Super featherweight Featherweight

Boxing career
- Stance: Southpaw

Boxing record
- Total fights: 177
- Wins: 137
- Win by KO: 76
- Losses: 36
- Draws: 4

George Henry "K.O." Chaney (born April 16, 1892 – December 20, 1958) was a featherweight and super-featherweight boxer active from 1910 to 1928. Chaney was born in Baltimore, Maryland to Irish-American parents. Boxing Illustrated ranked him fourth of all-time in terms of pound-for-pound punchers, while the Bleacher Report named him the 14th greatest southpaw in boxing history. He was inducted into the International Boxing Hall of Fame in 2014.

== Professional career ==
Chaney was afflicted with a "glass jaw", which was often his downfall against top ranked opponents. Chaney fought many professional lightweights and featherweights from his era, including Johnny Dundee, Rocky Kansas, Lew Tendler, and Abe Attell. Chaney was included in Ring Magazine's list of 100 greatest punchers of all time.

Chaney was afforded two opportunities to win a world title.

- On September 4, 1916, he challenged world featherweight champion Johnny Kilbane. Chaney lost to Kilbane by knockout in round 3.
- His second title opportunity came when he sought to capture the newly created world junior lightweight title on November 18, 1921. Chaney fought Johnny Dundee for the championship, but was disqualified in the fifth round.

His bout with Rocky Kansas at old Oriole Park in 1920 was said to be one of the most brutal and bloody bouts ever held in Baltimore.

== Professional boxing record ==
All information in this section is derived from BoxRec, unless otherwise stated.

=== Official record ===
178 fights	101 wins	21 losses
By knockout	78	8
By decision	21	3
By disqualification	2	10
Draws	3	
Newspaper decisions/draws	53	

All newspaper decisions are officially regarded as “no decision” bouts and are not counted in the win/loss/draw column.

No.	Result	Record	Opponent	Type	Round, time	Date	Location	Notes
178	Loss	101–21–3 (53)	Danny Kramer	KO	1 (10)	Aug 10, 1925	Shibe Park, Philadelphia, Pennsylvania, US	
177	Loss	101–20–3 (53)	Tommy O'Brien	KO	6 (10), 1:02	Feb 23, 1925	Madison Square Garden, New York, New York, US	
176	Win	101–19–3 (53)	Ray Mitchell	KO	5 (10)	Nov 27, 1924	Arena, Philadelphia, Pennsylvania, US	
175	Win	100–19–3 (53)	Danny Kramer	KO	1 (10)	Sep 8, 1924	Shibe Park, Philadelphia, Pennsylvania, US	
174	Win	99–19–3 (53)	Danny Rodgers	TKO	2 (8)	Jun 23, 1924	Shibe Park, Philadelphia, Pennsylvania, US	
173	Loss	98–19–3 (53)	Red Cap Wilson	DQ	2 (12)	Apr 16, 1924	Gayety Theater, Baltimore, Maryland, US	
172	Loss	98–18–3 (53)	Ted Marchant	DQ	3 (12)	Dec 5, 1923	Gayety Theater, Baltimore, Maryland, US	
171	Loss	98–17–3 (53)	Harry 'Kid' Brown	DQ	1 (8)	Sep 24, 1923	Arena, Philadelphia, Pennsylvania, US	
170	Win	98–16–3 (53)	Georgie Russell	KO	2 (8)	Sep 7, 1923	Shibe Park, Philadelphia, Pennsylvania, US	
169	Loss	97–16–3 (53)	Danny Kramer	DQ	2 (8)	May 24, 1923	Shibe Park, Philadelphia, Pennsylvania, US	
168	Win	97–15–3 (53)	Pep O'Brien	KO	1 (8)	Mar 22, 1923	Adelphia A.C., Philadelphia, Pennsylvania, US	
167	Draw	96–15–3 (53)	Bobby Ward	NWS	10	Mar 5, 1923	Detroit, Michigan, US	
166	Win	96–15–3 (52)	Alex Hart	NWS	8	Feb 12, 1923	Arena, Philadelphia, Pennsylvania, US	
165	Win	96–15–3 (51)	Henry Koster	KO	1 (8)	Feb 6, 1923	Chestnut Street Auditorium, Harrisburg, Pennsylvania, US	
164	Win	95–15–3 (51)	Frankie Rice	KO	1 (12), 1:10	Jan 29, 1923	Fourth Regiment Armory, Baltimore, Maryland, US	
163	Loss	94–15–3 (51)	Alex Hart	NWS	8	Dec 25, 1922	Arena, Philadelphia, Pennsylvania, US	
162	Win	94–15–3 (50)	Charley Pitts	NWS	8	Nov 20, 1922	Olympia A.C., Philadelphia, Pennsylvania, US	
161	Win	94–15–3 (49)	Shamus O'Brien	NWS	8	Oct 9, 1922	Olympia A.C., Philadelphia, Pennsylvania, US	
160	Win	94–15–3 (48)	Billy Angelo	KO	6 (8)	Sep 11, 1922	Shibe Park, Philadelphia, Pennsylvania, US	
159	Win	93–15–3 (48)	Earl France	TKO	2 (8)	Aug 24, 1922	Shibe Park, Philadelphia, Pennsylvania, US	
158	Win	92–15–3 (48)	Allie Nack	KO	1 (8)	Jun 6, 1922	Shibe Park, Philadelphia, Pennsylvania, US	
157	Win	91–15–3 (48)	Jimmy Hanlon	NWS	8	Apr 27, 1922	Ice Palace, Philadelphia, Pennsylvania, US	
156	Win	91–15–3 (47)	Shamus O'Brien	PTS	12	Apr 25, 1922	Playhouse, Baltimore, Maryland, US	
155	Win	90–15–3 (47)	Jimmy Hanlon	NWS	8	Mar 28, 1922	Ice Palace, Philadelphia, Pennsylvania, US	
154	Loss	90–15–3 (46)	Shamus O'Brien	NWS	8	Mar 4, 1922	National A.C., Philadelphia, Pennsylvania, US	
153	Win	90–15–3 (45)	Alex Hart	NWS	8	Feb 23, 1922	Ice Palace, Philadelphia, Pennsylvania, US	
152	Win	90–15–3 (44)	Harry Carlson	KO	5 (8)	Jan 30, 1922	Olympia A.C., Philadelphia, Pennsylvania, US	
151	Win	89–15–3 (44)	Alex Hart	TKO	4 (8)	Jan 17, 1922	Ice Palace, Philadelphia, Pennsylvania, US	
150	Win	88–15–3 (44)	Otto Wallace	PTS	12	Jan 2, 1922	4th Regiment Armory, Baltimore, Maryland, US	
149	Win	87–15–3 (44)	Mike Paulson	NWS	8	Dec 26, 1921	National A.C., Philadelphia, Pennsylvania, US	
148	Loss	87–15–3 (43)	Freddie Jacks	DQ	2 (8)	Dec 5, 1921	Olympia A.C., Philadelphia, Pennsylvania, US	
147	Loss	87–14–3 (43)	Johnny Dundee	DQ	5 (15), 1:07	Nov 18, 1921	Madison Square Garden, New York City, New York, US	For inaugural NYSAC super featherweight title
146	Win	87–13–3 (43)	Phil Salvadore	TKO	3 (8)	Nov 7, 1921	Olympia A.C., Philadelphia, Pennsylvania, US	
145	Win	86–13–3 (43)	Sammy Stone	KO	2 (8)	Aug 24, 1921	Shibe Park, Philadelphia, Pennsylvania, US	
144	Win	85–13–3 (43)	Bruiser Kelly	KO	2 (12)	Aug 4, 1921	Oriole Park, Baltimore, Maryland, US	
143	Loss	84–13–3 (43)	Johnny Dundee	NWS	8	Jul 18, 1921	Shibe Park, Philadelphia, Pennsylvania, US	
142	Win	84–13–3 (42)	Joe Tiplitz	NWS	8	Jun 29, 1921	Shibe Park, Philadelphia, Pennsylvania, US	
141	Loss	84–13–3 (41)	Johnny Dundee	PTS	10	Jun 10, 1921	Mechanics Building, Boston, Massachusetts, US	
140	Win	84–12–3 (41)	Billy McCann	NWS	12	Jun 2, 1921	League Park, Cleveland, Ohio, US	
139	Win	84–12–3 (40)	Al Murphy	KO	6 (10)	May 12, 1921	Maher's Auditorium, Shenandoah, Pennsylvania, US	
138	Win	83–12–3 (40)	Vincent 'Pepper' Martin	DQ	2 (8)	Apr 18, 1921	Camden Sportsmen's Club, Camden, New Jersey, US	
137	Win	82–12–3 (40)	Billy Angelo	TKO	3 (8)	Mar 28, 1921	Olympia A.C., Philadelphia, Pennsylvania, US	
136	Win	81–12–3 (40)	Gene Delmont	NWS	8	Mar 14, 1921	Olympia A.C., Philadelphia, Pennsylvania, US	
135	Loss	81–12–3 (39)	Willie Ritchie	DQ	8 (10)	Mar 10, 1921	Town Hall, Scranton, Pennsylvania, US	Not to be confused with Willie Ritchie
134	Win	81–11–3 (39)	Tim Droney	KO	3 (12)	Mar 4, 1921	4th Regiment Armory, Baltimore, Maryland, US	
133	Win	80–11–3 (39)	Babe Picato	KO	2 (8), 1:23	Feb 7, 1921	Olympia A.C., Philadelphia, Pennsylvania, US	
132	Win	79–11–3 (39)	Cal Delaney	KO	3 (10)	Jan 31, 1921	Olympic Winter Garden, Cleveland, Ohio, US	
131	Win	78–11–3 (39)	Al Murphy	TKO	5 (8)	Jan 10, 1921	Olympia A.C., Philadelphia, Pennsylvania, US	
130	Win	77–11–3 (39)	Georges Papin	TKO	3 (12)	Jan 6, 1921	5th Regiment Armory, Baltimore, Maryland, US	
129	Win	76–11–3 (39)	Charley Metrie	KO	1 (8)	Dec 13, 1920	Olympia A.C., Philadelphia, Pennsylvania, US	
128	Win	75–11–3 (39)	Joe Phillips	KO	3 (12)	Nov 26, 1920	Roller Rink, Cumberland, Maryland, US	
127	Win	74–11–3 (39)	Johnny Mahoney	TKO	4 (8)	Nov 15, 1920	Olympia A.C., Philadelphia, Pennsylvania, US	
126	Win	73–11–3 (39)	Johnny Rose	TKO	6 (12)	Nov 12, 1920	4th Regiment Armory, Baltimore, Maryland, US	
125	Win	72–11–3 (39)	George Brown	KO	1 (10), 1:37	Nov 5, 1920	Madison Square Garden, New York, New York, US	
124	Win	71–11–3 (39)	George Reynolds	KO	1 (8)	Sep 25, 1920	Fulton Opera House, Lancaster, Pennsylvania, US	
123	Win	70–11–3 (39)	Tim Droney	NWS	8	Sep 13, 1920	Fulton Opera House, Lancaster, Pennsylvania, US	
122	Loss	70–11–3 (38)	Rocky Kansas	PTS	12	Aug 23, 1920	Oriole Park, Baltimore, Maryland, US	
121	Loss	70–10–3 (38)	Joe Welling	NWS	8	Jun 23, 1920	Ice Palace, Philadelphia, Pennsylvania, US	
120	Loss	70–10–3 (37)	Joe Welling	NWS	6	May 19, 1920	Ice Palace, Philadelphia, Pennsylvania, US	
119	Win	70–10–3 (36)	Happy Smith	TKO	6 (12)	Mar 26, 1920	Albaugh Theater, Baltimore, Maryland, US	
118	Win	69–10–3 (36)	Whitey Fitzgerald	NWS	6	Mar 17, 1920	National A.C., Philadelphia, Pennsylvania, US	
117	Win	69–10–3 (35)	Frankie Brown	NWS	6	Jan 1, 1920	National A.C., Philadelphia, Pennsylvania, US	
116	Loss	69–10–3 (34)	Benny Valger	DQ	3 (6)	Dec 13, 1919	National A.C., Philadelphia, Pennsylvania, US	
115	Win	69–9–3 (34)	Johnny Drummie	KO	4 (12)	Dec 5, 1919	Albaugh Theater, Baltimore, Maryland, US	
114	Win	68–9–3 (34)	Eddie Moy	PTS	12	Nov 14, 1919	Albaugh Theater, Baltimore, Maryland, US	
113	Loss	67–9–3 (34)	Joe Tiplitz	TKO	4 (6), 1:14	Jul 14, 1919	Shibe Park, Philadelphia, Pennsylvania, US	
112	Loss	67–8–3 (34)	Lew Tendler	KO	1 (6), 1:12	Jun 4, 1919	Shibe Park, Philadelphia, Pennsylvania, US	
111	Win	67–7–3 (34)	Babe Picato	KO	4 (10)	May 30, 1919	Oriole Park, Baltimore, Maryland, US	
110	Win	66–7–3 (34)	Jack Russo	NWS	6	Apr 12, 1919	National A.C., Philadelphia, Pennsylvania, US	
109	Win	66–7–3 (33)	Young George Erne	NWS	10	Mar 17, 1919	Broadway Auditorium, Buffalo, New York, US	
108	Win	66–7–3 (32)	Phil Bloom	PTS	12	Mar 14, 1919	Albaugh Theater, Baltimore, Maryland, US	
107	Win	65–7–3 (32)	Tim Droney	NWS	6	Mar 8, 1919	National A.C., Philadelphia, Pennsylvania, US	
106	Win	65–7–3 (31)	Chick Simler	PTS	12	Feb 28, 1919	Albaugh Theater, Baltimore, Maryland, US	
105	Win	64–7–3 (31)	Phil Bloom	PTS	12	Feb 14, 1919	Albaugh Theater, Baltimore, Maryland, US	
104	Win	63–7–3 (31)	Pete Hartley	NWS	6	Feb 8, 1919	National A.C., Philadelphia, Pennsylvania, US	
103	Loss	63–7–3 (30)	Lew Tendler	NWS	6	Sep 18, 1918	National A.C., Philadelphia, Pennsylvania, US	
102	Win	63–7–3 (29)	Eddie O'Keefe	KO	5 (6)	Aug 30, 1918	Atlantic City, New Jersey, US	
101	Win	62–7–3 (29)	Harry Pierce	NWS	6	Aug 24, 1918	National A.C., Philadelphia, Pennsylvania, US	
100	Win	62–7–3 (28)	Mickey Donley	TKO	5 (8)	Aug 12, 1918	Atlantic City, New Jersey, US	
99	Win	61–7–3 (28)	Larry Hansen	TKO	5 (10)	Jun 29, 1918	Oriole Park, Baltimore, Maryland, US	
98	Loss	60–7–3 (28)	Johnny Ray	NWS	10	Jun 19, 1918	Forbes Field, Pittsburgh, Pennsylvania, US	
97	Loss	60–7–3 (27)	Frankie Callahan	NWS	6	May 6, 1918	Olympia A.C., Philadelphia, Pennsylvania, US	
96	Win	60–7–3 (26)	Jack Russo	KO	1 (15)	Apr 29, 1918	Lyric Theater, Baltimore, Maryland, US	
95	Win	59–7–3 (26)	Johnny Ray	NWS	6	Apr 1, 1918	Olympia A.C., Philadelphia, Pennsylvania, US	
94	Win	59–7–3 (25)	Charley Thomas	PTS	10	Mar 20, 1918	Albaugh Theater, Baltimore, Maryland, US	
93	Loss	58–7–3 (25)	Johnny Dundee	NWS	6	Mar 9, 1918	National A.C., Philadelphia, Pennsylvania, US	
92	Win	58–7–3 (24)	Eddie Wallace	PTS	10	Feb 18, 1918	Lyric Theater, Baltimore, Maryland, US	
91	Win	57–7–3 (24)	Packy Hommey	TKO	9 (15)	Jan 30, 1918	Albaugh Theater, Baltimore, Maryland, US	
90	Loss	56–7–3 (24)	Johnny Dundee	NWS	6	Nov 19, 1917	Olympia A.C., Philadelphia, Pennsylvania, US	
89	Loss	56–7–3 (23)	Rocky Kansas	NWS	6	Sep 10, 1917	Olympia A.C., Philadelphia, Pennsylvania, US	
88	Loss	56–7–3 (22)	Rocky Kansas	NWS	10	Jul 23, 1917	Broadway Auditorium, Buffalo, New York, US	
87	Draw	56–7–3 (21)	Johnny Dundee	NWS	6	Jul 12, 1917	Shibe Park, Philadelphia, Pennsylvania, US	
86	Win	56–7–3 (20)	Otto Yacknow	KO	1 (6)	May 19, 1917	National A.C., Philadelphia, Pennsylvania, US	
85	Win	55–7–3 (20)	Philadelphia Pal Moore	KO	2 (15)	May 14, 1917	Monumental Theater, Baltimore, Maryland, US	
84	Win	54–7–3 (20)	Young Terry McGovern	KO	4 (6)	May 12, 1917	National A.C., Philadelphia, Pennsylvania, US	
83	Win	53–7–3 (20)	Larry Hansen	TKO	4 (15)	Mar 19, 1917	Monumental Theater, Baltimore, Maryland, US	
82	Win	52–7–3 (20)	Johnny Mayo	NWS	6	Mar 10, 1917	National A.C., Philadelphia, Pennsylvania, US	
81	Loss	52–7–3 (19)	Frankie Britt	DQ	3 (12)	Feb 27, 1917	Armory, Boston, Massachusetts, US	
80	Win	52–6–3 (19)	Willie Jones	KO	5 (15)	Feb 12, 1917	Monumental Theater, Baltimore, Maryland, US	
79	Win	51–6–3 (19)	Al Delmont	PTS	15	Jan 29, 1917	Monumental Theater, Baltimore, Maryland, US	
78	Win	50–6–3 (19)	Kid Julian	KO	4 (15)	Jan 15, 1917	Monumental Theater, Baltimore, Maryland, US	
77	Win	49–6–3 (19)	Al Britt	KO	1 (15)	Dec 18, 1916	Monumental Theater, Baltimore, Maryland, US	
76	Loss	48–6–3 (19)	Johnny Kilbane	KO	3 (15), 2:27	Sep 4, 1916	Cedar Point Arena, Sandusky, Ohio, US	For world featherweight title
75	Win	48–5–3 (19)	Packy Hommey	NWS	10	Aug 3, 1916	Empire A.C., New York City, New York, US	
74	Win	48–5–3 (18)	Packy Hommey	PTS	12	Jun 9, 1916	Palace Theater, Baltimore, Maryland, US	
73	Win	47–5–3 (18)	Patsy Haley	NWS	10	Mar 13, 1916	Heuck's Opera House, Cincinnati, Ohio, US	
72	Win	47–5–3 (17)	Cal Delaney	NWS	10	Feb 17, 1916	Eagles Club, Cleveland, Ohio, US	
71	Win	47–5–3 (16)	Mickey Donley	TKO	4 (6)	Feb 12, 1916	National A.C., Philadelphia, Pennsylvania, US	
70	Win	46–5–3 (16)	Frankie Nelson	TKO	3 (10)	Jan 27, 1916	Monumental Theater, Baltimore, Maryland, US	
69	Win	45–5–3 (16)	Bobby Reynolds	KO	2 (10)	Nov 24, 1915	Monumental Theater, Baltimore, Maryland, US	
68	Win	44–5–3 (16)	Jack White	TKO	1 (10)	Oct 26, 1915	Monumental Theater, Baltimore, Maryland, US	
67	Win	43–5–3 (16)	Eddie Morgan	NWS	6	Oct 4, 1915	Olympia A.C., Philadelphia, Pennsylvania, US	
66	Draw	43–5–3 (15)	Eddie Morgan	PTS	10	Sep 15, 1915	Lyric Theater, Baltimore, Maryland, US	
65	Win	43–5–2 (15)	Eddie O'Keefe	NWS	6	Apr 26, 1915	Olympia A.C., Philadelphia, Pennsylvania, US	
64	Draw	43–5–2 (14)	Matt Brock	NWS	12	Mar 22, 1915	Akron, Ohio, US	
63	Win	43–5–2 (13)	Jimmy Fox	TKO	5 (6)	Mar 17, 1915	National A.C., Philadelphia, Pennsylvania, US	
62	Win	42–5–2 (13)	Cal Delaney	NWS	10	Mar 5, 1915	Lyric Theater, Baltimore, Maryland, US	
61	Win	42–5–2 (12)	Packy Hommey	PTS	10	Feb 3, 1915	Monumental Theater, Baltimore, Maryland, US	
60	Win	41–5–2 (12)	Packy Hommey	NWS	6	Jan 11, 1915	Olympia A.C., Philadelphia, Pennsylvania, US	
59	Win	41–5–2 (11)	Benny Kaufman	KO	6 (10)	Dec 4, 1914	People's Theater, Cincinnati, Ohio, US	
58	Win	40–5–2 (11)	Joe Harang	TKO	6 (10)	Nov 26, 1914	Coliseum, Toledo, Ohio, US	
57	Win	39–5–2 (11)	Cal Delaney	NWS	12	Oct 27, 1914	Akron, Ohio, US	
56	Win	39–5–2 (10)	Patsy Kline	NWS	6	Oct 3, 1914	National A.C., Philadelphia, Pennsylvania, US	
55	Win	39–5–2 (9)	KO Mars	RTD	4 (10)	Sep 3, 1914	Redland Field, Cincinnati, Ohio, US	
54	Win	38–5–2 (9)	Calvin Williams	KO	4 (12)	Aug 13, 1914	Elmwood Arena, Elmwood Place, Ohio, US	
53	Win	37–5–2 (9)	Young Abe Attell	TKO	1 (10)	Jul 11, 1914	Fairmont A.C., New York City, New York, US	
52	Draw	36–5–2 (9)	Patsy Cline	PTS	10	Jun 24, 1914	Oriole Park, Baltimore, Maryland, US	
51	Win	36–5–1 (9)	Tommy Houck	TKO	6 (15)	May 22, 1914	Monumental Theater, Baltimore, Maryland, US	
50	Loss	35–5–1 (9)	Joe Dundee	NWS	6	Apr 20, 1914	Olympia A.C., Philadelphia, Pennsylvania, US	
49	Win	35–5–1 (8)	Joe Coster	KO	4 (15)	Apr 13, 1914	Monumental Theatre, Baltimore, Maryland, US	
48	Win	34–5–1 (8)	Frankie Conway	NWS	6	Mar 9, 1914	Olympia A.C., Philadelphia, Pennsylvania, US	
47	Win	34–5–1 (7)	Jack Martin	KO	1 (15)	Mar 3, 1914	Monumental Theatre, Baltimore, Maryland, US	
46	Win	33–5–1 (7)	Jimmy Toland	TKO	4 (15)	Feb 10, 1914	Monumental Theatre, Baltimore, Maryland, US	
45	Win	32–5–1 (7)	Jimmy Toland	TKO	2 (15)	Jan 26, 1914	Monumental Theatre, Baltimore, Maryland, US	
44	Win	31–5–1 (7)	Eddie O'Keefe	KO	5 (6)	Dec 25, 1913	Olympia A.C., Philadelphia, Pennsylvania, US	
43	Win	30–5–1 (7)	Tommy Buck	NWS	6	Nov 27, 1913	Olympia A.C., Philadelphia, Pennsylvania, US	
42	Win	30–5–1 (6)	Young Britt	KO	1 (15), 1:20	Nov 19, 1913	Albaugh Theater, Baltimore, Maryland, US	
41	Win	29–5–1 (6)	Happy Davis	PTS	15	Oct 24, 1913	Albaugh Theater, Baltimore, Maryland, US	
40	Win	28–5–1 (6)	Ty Cobb	DQ	6 (15)	Jul 29, 1913	Palace Theater, Baltimore, Maryland, US	
39	Loss	27–5–1 (6)	Abe Attell	PTS	15	Apr 28, 1913	Empire Theater, Baltimore, Maryland, US	
38	Win	27–4–1 (6)	Young Britt	KO	2 (15)	Apr 8, 1913	Monumental Theater, Baltimore, Maryland, US	
37	Win	26–4–1 (6)	Kid Murphy	NWS	10	Jan 11, 1913	Fairmont A.C., New York City, New York, US	
36	Win	26–4–1 (5)	Reddy Moore	TKO	6 (10)	Jan 9, 1913	Forty-Fourth Street A.C., New York City, New York, US	
35	Win	25–4–1 (5)	Lew Siegel	KO	4 (6)	Jan 4, 1913	National A.C., Philadelphia, Pennsylvania, US	
34	Win	24–4–1 (5)	Babe Davis	TKO	2 (10)	Dec 14, 1912	Fairmont A.C., New York City, New York, US	
33	Win	23–4–1 (5)	Oscar Williams	NWS	6	Dec 11, 1912	National A.C., Philadelphia, Pennsylvania, US	
32	Loss	23–4–1 (4)	Charley Cross	DQ	1 (6)	Dec 11, 1912	National A.C., Philadelphia, Pennsylvania, US	
31	Win	23–3–1 (4)	Kid Herman	NWS	10	Nov 6, 1912	Fairmont A.C., New York City, New York, US	
30	Win	23–3–1 (3)	Danny Ridge	PTS	15	Oct 31, 1912	Albaugh Theater, Baltimore, Maryland, US	
29	Win	22–3–1 (3)	Tommy Hopkins	KO	7 (10)	Oct 12, 1912	Fairmont A.C., New York City, New York, US	
28	Loss	21–3–1 (3)	Tommy Houck	TKO	11 (15)	Oct 1, 1912	Albaugh's Theater, Baltimore, Maryland, US	
27	Loss	21–2–1 (3)	Mike Clancy	KO	6 (10)	Aug 9, 1912	Albaugh's Theater, Baltimore, Maryland, US	
26	Loss	21–1–1 (3)	George Kirkwood	NWS	10	Aug 5, 1912	Madison Square Garden, New York City, New York, US	
25	Win	21–1–1 (2)	Eddie Gillespie	KO	6 (10)	Jul 13, 1912	Fairmont A.C., New York City, New York, US	
24	Win	20–1–1 (2)	Al Delmont	PTS	15	Jul 1, 1912	Oriole Park, Baltimore, Maryland, US	
23	Win	19–1–1 (2)	Battling Kennedy	KO	4 (15)	May 6, 1912	Holliday Street Arena, Baltimore, Maryland, US	
22	Win	18–1–1 (2)	Phil McGovern	TKO	9 (15)	Mar 19, 1912	Albaugh Theater, Baltimore, Maryland, US	
21	Win	17–1–1 (2)	Johnny Daly	PTS	6	Mar 6, 1912	Albaugh Theater, Baltimore, Maryland, US	
20	Win	16–1–1 (2)	Charley Goldman	PTS	15	Feb 2, 1912	Albaugh Theater, Baltimore, Maryland, US	
19	Win	15–1–1 (2)	Johnny Eggers	KO	3 (10)	Jan 6, 1912	Fairmont A.C., New York City, New York, US	
18	Win	14–1–1 (2)	Kid Black	NWS	10	Dec 23, 1911	Fairmont A.C., New York City, New York, US	
17	Loss	14–1–1 (1)	Johnny McLean	NWS	10	Dec 14, 1911	National S.C., New York City, New York, US	
16	Win	14–1–1	Billy Herman	PTS	6	Nov 24, 1911	Germania Maennerchor Hall, Baltimore, Maryland, US	
15	Win	13–1–1	Young Houck	KO	3 (6)	Nov 10, 1911	Germania Maennerchor Hall, Baltimore, Maryland, US	
14	Win	12–1–1	Eddie Doyle	KO	3 (15)	Oct 18, 1911	Germania Maennerchor Hall, Baltimore, Maryland, US	
13	Win	11–1–1	Young McCue	KO	3 (15)	Aug 28, 1911	Savoy Theater, Baltimore, Maryland, US	
12	Win	10–1–1	Benny Reilly	TKO	4 (15)	Aug 14, 1911	Savoy Theater, Baltimore, Maryland, US	
11	Win	9–1–1	Kid Williams	PTS	20	Jul 10, 1911	Ford Opera House, Baltimore, Maryland, US	
10	Loss	8–1–1	Young Britt	KO	6 (15)	Apr 12, 1911	Ford Opera House, Baltimore, Maryland, US	
9	Win	8–0–1	Kid Egan	PTS	15	Feb 10, 1911	Germania Maennerchor Hall, Baltimore, Maryland, US	
8	Win	7–0–1	Tommy Buck	PTS	15	Jan 13, 1911	Germania Maennerchor Hall, Baltimore, Maryland, US	
7	Win	6–0–1	Kid Williams	KO	6 (15)	Jan 2, 1911	Germania Maennerchor Hall, Baltimore, Maryland, US	
6	Draw	5–0–1	Shep Farren	PTS	3	Dec 9, 1910	Germania Maennerchor Hall, Baltimore, Maryland, US	
5	Win	4–0–1	Young McCue	KO	3 (6)	Dec 9, 1910	Germania Maennerchor Hall, Baltimore, Maryland, US	
4	Win	4–0	Young Jack O'Brien	TKO	2 (6)	Nov 1, 1910	Princess Theater, Baltimore, Maryland, US	
3	Win	3–0	Young Kelly	KO	1 (?)	Oct 20, 1910	Germania Maennerchor Hall, Baltimore, Maryland, US	
2	Win	2–0	Young Battling Kelly	PTS	6	Oct 11, 1910	Albaugh Theater, Baltimore, Maryland, US	
1	Win	1–0	Young Kid Williams	KO	1 (6)	Oct 4, 1910	Albaugh Theater, Baltimore, Maryland, US	

=== Unofficial record ===
178 fights	136 wins	36 losses
By knockout	78	8
By decision	56	18
By disqualification	2	10
Draws	6	

Record with the inclusion of newspaper decisions in the win/loss/draw column.

No.	Result	Record	Opponent	Type	Round, time	Date	Location	Notes
178	Loss	136–36–6	Danny Kramer	KO	1 (10)	Aug 10, 1925	Shibe Park, Philadelphia, Pennsylvania, US	
177	Loss	136–35–6	Tommy O'Brien	KO	6 (10), 1:02	Feb 23, 1925	Madison Square Garden, New York City, New York, US	
176	Win	136–34–6	Ray Mitchell	KO	5 (10)	Nov 27, 1924	Arena, Philadelphia, Pennsylvania, US	
175	Win	135–34–6	Danny Kramer	KO	1 (10)	Sep 8, 1924	Shibe Park, Philadelphia, Pennsylvania, US	
174	Win	134–34–6	Danny Rodgers	TKO	2 (8)	Jun 23, 1924	Shibe Park, Philadelphia, Pennsylvania, US	
173	Loss	133–34–6	Red Cap Wilson	DQ	2 (12)	Apr 16, 1924	Gayety Theater, Baltimore, Maryland, US	
172	Loss	133–33–6	Ted Marchant	DQ	3 (12)	Dec 5, 1923	Gayety Theater, Baltimore, Maryland, US	
171	Loss	133–32–6	Harry 'Kid' Brown	DQ	1 (8)	Sep 24, 1923	Arena, Philadelphia, Pennsylvania, US	
170	Win	133–31–6	Georgie Russell	KO	2 (8)	Sep 7, 1923	Shibe Park, Philadelphia, Pennsylvania, US	
169	Loss	132–31–6	Danny Kramer	DQ	2 (8)	May 24, 1923	Shibe Park, Philadelphia, Pennsylvania, US	
168	Win	132–30–6	Pep O'Brien	KO	1 (8)	Mar 22, 1923	Adelphia A.C., Philadelphia, Pennsylvania, US	
167	Draw	131–30–6	Bobby Ward	NWS	10	Mar 5, 1923	Detroit, Michigan, US	
166	Win	131–30–5	Alex Hart	NWS	8	Feb 12, 1923	Arena, Philadelphia, Pennsylvania, US	
165	Win	130–30–5	Henry Koster	KO	1 (8)	Feb 6, 1923	Chestnut Street Auditorium, Harrisburg, Pennsylvania, US	
164	Win	129–30–5	Frankie Rice	KO	1 (12), 1:10	Jan 29, 1923	Fourth Regiment Armory, Baltimore, Maryland, US	
163	Loss	128–30–5	Alex Hart	NWS	8	Dec 25, 1922	Arena, Philadelphia, Pennsylvania, US	
162	Win	128–29–5	Charley Pitts	NWS	8	Nov 20, 1922	Olympia A.C., Philadelphia, Pennsylvania, US	
161	Win	127–29–5	Shamus O'Brien	NWS	8	Oct 9, 1922	Olympia A.C., Philadelphia, Pennsylvania, US	
160	Win	126–29–5	Billy Angelo	KO	6 (8)	Sep 11, 1922	Shibe Park, Philadelphia, Pennsylvania, US	
159	Win	125–29–5	Earl France	TKO	2 (8)	Aug 24, 1922	Shibe Park, Philadelphia, Pennsylvania, US	
158	Win	124–29–5	Allie Nack	KO	1 (8)	Jun 6, 1922	Shibe Park, Philadelphia, Pennsylvania, US	
157	Win	123–29–5	Jimmy Hanlon	NWS	8	Apr 27, 1922	Ice Palace, Philadelphia, Pennsylvania, US	
156	Win	122–29–5	Shamus O'Brien	PTS	12	Apr 25, 1922	Playhouse, Baltimore, Maryland, US	
155	Win	121–29–5	Jimmy Hanlon	NWS	8	Mar 28, 1922	Ice Palace, Philadelphia, Pennsylvania, US	
154	Loss	120–29–5	Shamus O'Brien	NWS	8	Mar 4, 1922	National A.C., Philadelphia, Pennsylvania, US	
153	Win	120–28–5	Alex Hart	NWS	8	Feb 23, 1922	Ice Palace, Philadelphia, Pennsylvania, US	
152	Win	119–28–5	Harry Carlson	KO	5 (8)	Jan 30, 1922	Olympia A.C., Philadelphia, Pennsylvania, US	
151	Win	118–28–5	Alex Hart	TKO	4 (8)	Jan 17, 1922	Ice Palace, Philadelphia, Pennsylvania, US	
150	Win	117–28–5	Otto Wallace	PTS	12	Jan 2, 1922	4th Regiment Armory, Baltimore, Maryland, US	
149	Win	116–28–5	Mike Paulson	NWS	8	Dec 26, 1921	National A.C., Philadelphia, Pennsylvania, US	
148	Loss	115–28–5	Freddie Jacks	DQ	2 (8)	Dec 5, 1921	Olympia A.C., Philadelphia, Pennsylvania, US	
147	Loss	115–27–5	Johnny Dundee	DQ	5 (15), 1:07	Nov 18, 1921	Madison Square Garden, New York City, New York, US	For inaugural NYSAC super featherweight title
146	Win	115–26–5	Phil Salvadore	TKO	3 (8)	Nov 7, 1921	Olympia A.C., Philadelphia, Pennsylvania, US	
145	Win	114–26–5	Sammy Stone	KO	2 (8)	Aug 24, 1921	Shibe Park, Philadelphia, Pennsylvania, US	
144	Win	113–26–5	Bruiser Kelly	KO	2 (12)	Aug 4, 1921	Oriole Park, Baltimore, Maryland, US	
143	Loss	112–26–5	Johnny Dundee	NWS	8	Jul 18, 1921	Shibe Park, Philadelphia, Pennsylvania, US	
142	Win	112–25–5	Joe Tiplitz	NWS	8	Jun 29, 1921	Shibe Park, Philadelphia, Pennsylvania, US	
141	Loss	111–25–5	Johnny Dundee	PTS	10	Jun 10, 1921	Mechanics Building, Boston, Massachusetts, US	
140	Win	111–24–5	Billy McCann	NWS	12	Jun 2, 1921	League Park, Cleveland, Ohio, US	
139	Win	110–24–5	Al Murphy	KO	6 (10)	May 12, 1921	Maher's Auditorium, Shenandoah, Pennsylvania, US	
138	Win	109–24–5	Vincent 'Pepper' Martin	DQ	2 (8)	Apr 18, 1921	Camden Sportsmen's Club, Camden, New Jersey, US	
137	Win	108–24–5	Billy Angelo	TKO	3 (8)	Mar 28, 1921	Olympia A.C., Philadelphia, Pennsylvania, US	
136	Win	107–24–5	Gene Delmont	NWS	8	Mar 14, 1921	Olympia A.C., Philadelphia, Pennsylvania, US	
135	Loss	106–24–5	Willie Ritchie	DQ	8 (10)	Mar 10, 1921	Town Hall, Scranton, Pennsylvania, US	Not to be confused with Willie Ritchie
134	Win	106–23–5	Tim Droney	KO	3 (12)	Mar 4, 1921	4th Regiment Armory, Baltimore, Maryland, US	
133	Win	105–23–5	Babe Picato	KO	2 (8), 1:23	Feb 7, 1921	Olympia A.C., Philadelphia, Pennsylvania, US	
132	Win	104–23–5	Cal Delaney	KO	3 (10)	Jan 31, 1921	Olympic Winter Garden, Cleveland, Ohio, US	
131	Win	103–23–5	Al Murphy	TKO	5 (8)	Jan 10, 1921	Olympia A.C., Philadelphia, Pennsylvania, US	
130	Win	102–23–5	Georges Papin	TKO	3 (12)	Jan 6, 1921	5th Regiment Armory, Baltimore, Maryland, US	
129	Win	101–23–5	Charley Metrie	KO	1 (8)	Dec 13, 1920	Olympia A.C., Philadelphia, Pennsylvania, US	
128	Win	100–23–5	Joe Phillips	KO	3 (12)	Nov 26, 1920	Roller Rink, Cumberland, Maryland, US	
127	Win	99–23–5	Johnny Mahoney	TKO	4 (8)	Nov 15, 1920	Olympia A.C., Philadelphia, Pennsylvania, US	
126	Win	98–23–5	Johnny Rose	TKO	6 (12)	Nov 12, 1920	4th Regiment Armory, Baltimore, Maryland, US	
125	Win	97–23–5	George Brown	KO	1 (10), 1:37	Nov 5, 1920	Madison Square Garden, New York City, New York, US	
124	Win	96–23–5	George Reynolds	KO	1 (8)	Sep 25, 1920	Fulton Opera House, Lancaster, Pennsylvania, US	
123	Win	95–23–5	Tim Droney	NWS	8	Sep 13, 1920	Fulton Opera House, Lancaster, Pennsylvania, US	
122	Loss	94–23–5	Rocky Kansas	PTS	12	Aug 23, 1920	Oriole Park, Baltimore, Maryland, US	
121	Loss	94–22–5	Joe Welling	NWS	8	Jun 23, 1920	Ice Palace, Philadelphia, Pennsylvania, US	
120	Loss	94–21–5	Joe Welling	NWS	6	May 19, 1920	Ice Palace, Philadelphia, Pennsylvania, US	
119	Win	94–20–5	Happy Smith	TKO	6 (12)	Mar 26, 1920	Albaugh Theater, Baltimore, Maryland, US	
118	Win	93–20–5	Whitey Fitzgerald	NWS	6	Mar 17, 1920	National A.C., Philadelphia, Pennsylvania, US	
117	Win	92–20–5	Frankie Brown	NWS	6	Jan 1, 1920	National A.C., Philadelphia, Pennsylvania, US	
116	Loss	91–20–5	Benny Valger	DQ	3 (6)	Dec 13, 1919	National A.C., Philadelphia, Pennsylvania, US	
115	Win	91–19–5	Johnny Drummie	KO	4 (12)	Dec 5, 1919	Albaugh Theater, Baltimore, Maryland, US	
114	Win	90–19–5	Eddie Moy	PTS	12	Nov 14, 1919	Albaugh Theater, Baltimore, Maryland, US	
113	Loss	89–19–5	Joe Tiplitz	TKO	4 (6), 1:14	Jul 14, 1919	Shibe Park, Philadelphia, Pennsylvania, US	
112	Loss	89–18–5	Lew Tendler	KO	1 (6), 1:12	Jun 4, 1919	Shibe Park, Philadelphia, Pennsylvania, US	
111	Win	89–17–5	Babe Picato	KO	4 (10)	May 30, 1919	Oriole Park, Baltimore, Maryland, US	
110	Win	88–17–5	Jack Russo	NWS	6	Apr 12, 1919	National A.C., Philadelphia, Pennsylvania, US	
109	Win	87–17–5	Young George Erne	NWS	10	Mar 17, 1919	Broadway Auditorium, Buffalo, New York, US	
108	Win	86–17–5	Phil Bloom	PTS	12	Mar 14, 1919	Albaugh Theater, Baltimore, Maryland, US	
107	Win	85–17–5	Tim Droney	NWS	6	Mar 8, 1919	National A.C., Philadelphia, Pennsylvania, US	
106	Win	84–17–5	Chick Simler	PTS	12	Feb 28, 1919	Albaugh Theater, Baltimore, Maryland, US	
105	Win	83–17–5	Phil Bloom	PTS	12	Feb 14, 1919	Albaugh Theater, Baltimore, Maryland, US	
104	Win	82–17–5	Pete Hartley	NWS	6	Feb 8, 1919	National A.C., Philadelphia, Pennsylvania, US	
103	Loss	81–17–5	Lew Tendler	NWS	6	Sep 18, 1918	National A.C., Philadelphia, Pennsylvania, US	
102	Win	81–16–5	Eddie O'Keefe	KO	5 (6)	Aug 30, 1918	Atlantic City, New Jersey, US	
101	Win	80–16–5	Harry Pierce	NWS	6	Aug 24, 1918	National A.C., Philadelphia, Pennsylvania, US	
100	Win	79–16–5	Mickey Donley	TKO	5 (8)	Aug 12, 1918	Atlantic City, New Jersey, US	
99	Win	78–16–5	Larry Hansen	TKO	5 (10)	Jun 29, 1918	Oriole Park, Baltimore, Maryland, US	
98	Loss	77–16–5	Johnny Ray	NWS	10	Jun 19, 1918	Forbes Field, Pittsburgh, Pennsylvania, US	
97	Loss	77–15–5	Frankie Callahan	NWS	6	May 6, 1918	Olympia A.C., Philadelphia, Pennsylvania, US	
96	Win	77–14–5	Jack Russo	KO	1 (15)	Apr 29, 1918	Lyric Theater, Baltimore, Maryland, US	
95	Win	76–14–5	Johnny Ray	NWS	6	Apr 1, 1918	Olympia A.C., Philadelphia, Pennsylvania, US	
94	Win	75–14–5	Charley Thomas	PTS	10	Mar 20, 1918	Albaugh Theater, Baltimore, Maryland, US	
93	Loss	74–14–5	Johnny Dundee	NWS	6	Mar 9, 1918	National A.C., Philadelphia, Pennsylvania, US	
92	Win	74–13–5	Eddie Wallace	PTS	10	Feb 18, 1918	Lyric Theater, Baltimore, Maryland, US	
91	Win	73–13–5	Packy Hommey	TKO	9 (15)	Jan 30, 1918	Albaugh Theater, Baltimore, Maryland, US	
90	Loss	72–13–5	Johnny Dundee	NWS	6	Nov 19, 1917	Olympia A.C., Philadelphia, Pennsylvania, US	
89	Loss	72–12–5	Rocky Kansas	NWS	6	Sep 10, 1917	Olympia A.C., Philadelphia, Pennsylvania, US	
88	Loss	72–11–5	Rocky Kansas	NWS	10	Jul 23, 1917	Broadway Auditorium, Buffalo, New York, US	
87	Draw	72–10–5	Johnny Dundee	NWS	6	Jul 12, 1917	Shibe Park, Philadelphia, Pennsylvania, US	
86	Win	72–10–4	Otto Yacknow	KO	1 (6)	May 19, 1917	National A.C., Philadelphia, Pennsylvania, US	
85	Win	71–10–4	Philadelphia Pal Moore	KO	2 (15)	May 14, 1917	Monumental Theater, Baltimore, Maryland, US	
84	Win	70–10–4	Young Terry McGovern	KO	4 (6)	May 12, 1917	National A.C., Philadelphia, Pennsylvania, US	
83	Win	69–10–4	Larry Hansen	TKO	4 (15)	Mar 19, 1917	Monumental Theater, Baltimore, Maryland, US	
82	Win	68–10–4	Johnny Mayo	NWS	6	Mar 10, 1917	National A.C., Philadelphia, Pennsylvania, US	
81	Loss	67–10–4	Frankie Britt	DQ	3 (12)	Feb 27, 1917	Armory, Boston, Massachusetts, US	
80	Win	67–9–4	Willie Jones	KO	5 (15)	Feb 12, 1917	Monumental Theater, Baltimore, Maryland, US	
79	Win	66–9–4	Al Delmont	PTS	15	Jan 29, 1917	Monumental Theater, Baltimore, Maryland, US	
78	Win	65–9–4	Kid Julian	KO	4 (15)	Jan 15, 1917	Monumental Theater, Baltimore, Maryland, US	
77	Win	64–9–4	Al Britt	KO	1 (15)	Dec 18, 1916	Monumental Theater, Baltimore, Maryland, US	
76	Loss	63–9–4	Johnny Kilbane	KO	3 (15), 2:27	Sep 4, 1916	Cedar Point Arena, Sandusky, Ohio, US	For world featherweight title
75	Win	63–8–4	Packy Hommey	NWS	10	Aug 3, 1916	Empire A.C., New York City, New York, US	
74	Win	62–8–4	Packy Hommey	PTS	12	Jun 9, 1916	Palace Theater, Baltimore, Maryland, US	
73	Win	61–8–4	Patsy Haley	NWS	10	Mar 13, 1916	Heuck's Opera House, Cincinnati, Ohio, US	
72	Win	60–8–4	Cal Delaney	NWS	10	Feb 17, 1916	Eagles Club, Cleveland, Ohio, US	
71	Win	59–8–4	Mickey Donley	TKO	4 (6)	Feb 12, 1916	National A.C., Philadelphia, Pennsylvania, US	
70	Win	58–8–4	Frankie Nelson	TKO	3 (10)	Jan 27, 1916	Monumental Theater, Baltimore, Maryland, US	
69	Win	57–8–4	Bobby Reynolds	KO	2 (10)	Nov 24, 1915	Monumental Theater, Baltimore, Maryland, US	
68	Win	56–8–4	Jack White	TKO	1 (10)	Oct 26, 1915	Monumental Theater, Baltimore, Maryland, US	
67	Win	55–8–4	Eddie Morgan	NWS	6	Oct 4, 1915	Olympia A.C., Philadelphia, Pennsylvania, US	
66	Draw	54–8–4	Eddie Morgan	PTS	10	Sep 15, 1915	Lyric Theater, Baltimore, Maryland, US	
65	Win	54–8–3	Eddie O'Keefe	NWS	6	Apr 26, 1915	Olympia A.C., Philadelphia, Pennsylvania, US	
64	Draw	53–8–3	Matt Brock	NWS	12	Mar 22, 1915	Akron, Ohio, US	
63	Win	53–8–2	Jimmy Fox	TKO	5 (6)	Mar 17, 1915	National A.C., Philadelphia, Pennsylvania, US	
62	Win	52–8–2	Cal Delaney	NWS	10	Mar 5, 1915	Lyric Theater, Baltimore, Maryland, US	
61	Win	51–8–2	Packy Hommey	PTS	10	Feb 3, 1915	Monumental Theater, Baltimore, Maryland, US	
60	Win	50–8–2	Packy Hommey	NWS	6	Jan 11, 1915	Olympia A.C., Philadelphia, Pennsylvania, US	
59	Win	49–8–2	Benny Kaufman	KO	6 (10)	Dec 4, 1914	People's Theater, Cincinnati, Ohio, US	
58	Win	48–8–2	Joe Harang	TKO	6 (10)	Nov 26, 1914	Coliseum, Toledo, Ohio, US	
57	Win	47–8–2	Cal Delaney	NWS	12	Oct 27, 1914	Akron, Ohio, US	
56	Win	46–8–2	Patsy Kline	NWS	6	Oct 3, 1914	National A.C., Philadelphia, Pennsylvania, US	
55	Win	45–8–2	KO Mars	RTD	4 (10)	Sep 3, 1914	Redland Field, Cincinnati, Ohio, US	
54	Win	44–8–2	Calvin Williams	KO	4 (12)	Aug 13, 1914	Elmwood Arena, Elmwood Place, Ohio, US	
53	Win	43–8–2	Young Abe Attell	TKO	1 (10)	Jul 11, 1914	Fairmont A.C., New York City, New York, US	
52	Draw	42–8–2	Patsy Cline	PTS	10	Jun 24, 1914	Oriole Park, Baltimore, Maryland, US	
51	Win	42–8–1	Tommy Houck	TKO	6 (15)	May 22, 1914	Monumental Theater, Baltimore, Maryland, US	
50	Loss	41–8–1	Joe Dundee	NWS	6	Apr 20, 1914	Olympia A.C., Philadelphia, Pennsylvania, US	
49	Win	41–7–1	Joe Coster	KO	4 (15)	Apr 13, 1914	Monumental Theatre, Baltimore, Maryland, US	
48	Win	40–7–1	Frankie Conway	NWS	6	Mar 9, 1914	Olympia A.C., Philadelphia, Pennsylvania, US	
47	Win	39–7–1	Jack Martin	KO	1 (15)	Mar 3, 1914	Monumental Theatre, Baltimore, Maryland, US	
46	Win	38–7–1	Jimmy Toland	TKO	4 (15)	Feb 10, 1914	Monumental Theatre, Baltimore, Maryland, US	
45	Win	37–7–1	Jimmy Toland	TKO	2 (15)	Jan 26, 1914	Monumental Theatre, Baltimore, Maryland, US	
44	Win	36–7–1	Eddie O'Keefe	KO	5 (6)	Dec 25, 1913	Olympia A.C., Philadelphia, Pennsylvania, US	
43	Win	35–7–1	Tommy Buck	NWS	6	Nov 27, 1913	Olympia A.C., Philadelphia, Pennsylvania, US	
42	Win	34–7–1	Young Britt	KO	1 (15), 1:20	Nov 19, 1913	Albaugh Theater, Baltimore, Maryland, US	
41	Win	33–7–1	Happy Davis	PTS	15	Oct 24, 1913	Albaugh Theater, Baltimore, Maryland, US	
40	Win	32–7–1	Ty Cobb	DQ	6 (15)	Jul 29, 1913	Palace Theater, Baltimore, Maryland, US	
39	Loss	31–7–1	Abe Attell	PTS	15	Apr 28, 1913	Empire Theater, Baltimore, Maryland, US	
38	Win	31–6–1	Young Britt	KO	2 (15)	Apr 8, 1913	Monumental Theater, Baltimore, Maryland, US	
37	Win	30–6–1	Kid Murphy	NWS	10	Jan 11, 1913	Fairmont A.C., New York City, New York, US	
36	Win	29–6–1	Reddy Moore	TKO	6 (10)	Jan 9, 1913	Forty-Fourth Street A.C., New York City, New York, US	
35	Win	28–6–1	Lew Siegel	KO	4 (6)	Jan 4, 1913	National A.C., Philadelphia, Pennsylvania, US	
34	Win	27–6–1	Babe Davis	TKO	2 (10)	Dec 14, 1912	Fairmont A.C., New York City, New York, US	
33	Win	26–6–1	Oscar Williams	NWS	6	Dec 11, 1912	National A.C., Philadelphia, Pennsylvania, US	
32	Loss	25–6–1	Charley Cross	DQ	1 (6)	Dec 11, 1912	National A.C., Philadelphia, Pennsylvania, US	
31	Win	25–5–1	Kid Herman	NWS	10	Nov 6, 1912	Fairmont A.C., New York City, New York, US	
30	Win	24–5–1	Danny Ridge	PTS	15	Oct 31, 1912	Albaugh Theater, Baltimore, Maryland, US	
29	Win	23–5–1	Tommy Hopkins	KO	7 (10)	Oct 12, 1912	Fairmont A.C., New York City, New York, US	
28	Loss	22–5–1	Tommy Houck	TKO	11 (15)	Oct 1, 1912	Albaugh's Theater, Baltimore, Maryland, US	
27	Loss	22–4–1	Mike Clancy	KO	6 (10)	Aug 9, 1912	Albaugh's Theater, Baltimore, Maryland, US	
26	Loss	22–3–1	George Kirkwood	NWS	10	Aug 5, 1912	Madison Square Garden, New York City, New York, US	
25	Win	22–2–1	Eddie Gillespie	KO	6 (10)	Jul 13, 1912	Fairmont A.C., New York City, New York, US	
24	Win	21–2–1	Al Delmont	PTS	15	Jul 1, 1912	Oriole Park, Baltimore, Maryland, US	
23	Win	20–2–1	Battling Kennedy	KO	4 (15)	May 6, 1912	Holliday Street Arena, Baltimore, Maryland, US	
22	Win	19–2–1	Phil McGovern	TKO	9 (15)	Mar 19, 1912	Albaugh Theater, Baltimore, Maryland, US	
21	Win	18–2–1	Johnny Daly	PTS	6	Mar 6, 1912	Albaugh Theater, Baltimore, Maryland, US	
20	Win	17–2–1	Charley Goldman	PTS	15	Feb 2, 1912	Albaugh Theater, Baltimore, Maryland, US	
19	Win	16–2–1	Johnny Eggers	KO	3 (10)	Jan 6, 1912	Fairmont A.C., New York City, New York, US	
18	Win	15–2–1	Kid Black	NWS	10	Dec 23, 1911	Fairmont A.C., New York City, New York, US	
17	Loss	14–2–1	Johnny McLean	NWS	10	Dec 14, 1911	National S.C., New York City, New York, US	
16	Win	14–1–1	Billy Herman	PTS	6	Nov 24, 1911	Germania Maennerchor Hall, Baltimore, Maryland, US	
15	Win	13–1–1	Young Houck	KO	3 (6)	Nov 10, 1911	Germania Maennerchor Hall, Baltimore, Maryland, US	
14	Win	12–1–1	Eddie Doyle	KO	3 (15)	Oct 18, 1911	Germania Maennerchor Hall, Baltimore, Maryland, US	
13	Win	11–1–1	Young McCue	KO	3 (15)	Aug 28, 1911	Savoy Theater, Baltimore, Maryland, US	
12	Win	10–1–1	Benny Reilly	TKO	4 (15)	Aug 14, 1911	Savoy Theater, Baltimore, Maryland, US	
11	Win	9–1–1	Kid Williams	PTS	20	Jul 10, 1911	Ford Opera House, Baltimore, Maryland, US	
10	Loss	8–1–1	Young Britt	KO	6 (15)	Apr 12, 1911	Ford Opera House, Baltimore, Maryland, US	
9	Win	8–0–1	Kid Egan	PTS	15	Feb 10, 1911	Germania Maennerchor Hall, Baltimore, Maryland, US	
8	Win	7–0–1	Tommy Buck	PTS	15	Jan 13, 1911	Germania Maennerchor Hall, Baltimore, Maryland, US	
7	Win	6–0–1	Kid Williams	KO	6 (15)	Jan 2, 1911	Germania Maennerchor Hall, Baltimore, Maryland, US	
6	Draw	5–0–1	Shep Farren	PTS	3	Dec 9, 1910	Germania Maennerchor Hall, Baltimore, Maryland, US	
5	Win	4–0–1	Young McCue	KO	3 (6)	Dec 9, 1910	Germania Maennerchor Hall, Baltimore, Maryland, US	
4	Win	4–0	Young Jack O'Brien	TKO	2 (6)	Nov 1, 1910	Princess Theater, Baltimore, Maryland, US	
3	Win	3–0	Young Kelly	KO	1 (?)	Oct 20, 1910	Germania Maennerchor Hall, Baltimore, Maryland, US	
2	Win	2–0	Young Battling Kelly	PTS	6	Oct 11, 1910	Albaugh Theater, Baltimore, Maryland, US	
1	Win	1–0	Young Kid Williams	KO	1 (6)	Oct 4, 1910	Albaugh Theater, Baltimore, Maryland, US	
