= Frankie Callahan =

American boxer

Personal information
- Nationality: United States
- Born: Samuel Holtzman; February 10, 1895 Brooklyn, New York, U.S.
- Died: September 5, 1927 (aged 32)
- Weight: Lightweight

Boxing career
- Stance: Southpaw

Boxing record
- Total fights: 172
- Wins: 104
- Win by KO: 24
- Losses: 42
- Draws: 25
- No contests: 1

Frankie Callahan (born Samuel Holtzman, February 10, 1895, in Brooklyn, New York – September 5, 1927) was an American boxer. He was undefeated in his first five fights. This lightweight boxer fought a total of 172 bouts, winning 104 and with 24 knockouts. He lost 42 bouts and had 25 draws. He died of pneumonia at age 32.

== Fights ==
Callahan was not alone in choosing to fight under an Irish name. He began boxing in 1911. In Brooklyn, New York, his bout with Harlem Tommy Murphy was a draw, while he lost two consecutive fights with Johnny Dundee lost by decision. Frankie again fought Dundee in Cincinnati, Ohio, and won by decision but in Buffalo, New York, he lost by decision to Rocky Kansas. Frankie's fights with Dundee and Charley White in Brooklyn, New York, were a draw.

Frankie met Dundee again in Boston, Massachusetts, but this time he lost by decision. In Buffalo Frankie faced Rocky Kansas again and won by decision. He fought Lew Tendler in Philadelphia, Pennsylvania, and in Atlantic City, New Jersey, but lost both by decision. Tendler and Frankie met 3 more times with Tendler winning all 3 fights, one by decision and the other two by knockout. In Philadelphia, Pennsylvania, Frankie again fought George KO Chaney, to a draw. He lost his last bout with Dundee in Boston by decision.
