= Johnny Dundee =

American boxer (1893–1965)

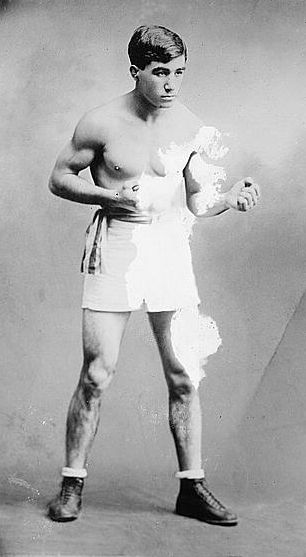

Personal information
- Nicknames: "Little Bar of Iron"; Scotch Wop
- Nationality: American
- Born: Giuseppe Curreri; November 19, 1893 Sciacca, Sicily, Italy
- Died: April 22, 1965 (aged 71) East Orange, New Jersey, U.S.
- Height: 5 ft 4 1/2 in (1.64 m)
- Weight: Featherweight; Junior Lightweight; Lightweight

Boxing career
- Reach: 63 in (160 cm)
- Stance: Orthodox

Boxing record
- Total fights: 334
- Wins: 201
- Win by KO: 17
- Losses: 73
- Draws: 46
- No contests: 14

Johnny "The Scotch Wop" Dundee (November 19, 1893 – April 22, 1965) was an American featherweight and the first world junior lightweight champion boxer who fought from 1910 until 1932. He was inducted into the Ring Magazine Hall of Fame in 1957 and the International Boxing Hall of Fame class of 1991.

== Early life ==
Giuseppe Curreri was born in Sciacca, Agrigento, Sicily, Italy to Calogero Curreri (1857 - 1937) and Ignazia Segreto (1859 - 1921). His father was a fisherman. His parents immigrated to the United States in 1909. He was raised on Manhattan's West Side where his father owned a fish shop on 41st Street and 9th Avenue.

== Professional career ==
=== Name ===
Curreri was given his ring name in 1910 by his former manager, Scotty Montieth, of Dundee, Scotland.

Scotty saw me scrapping in front of my old man's fish place. He convinced me I could make a living fighting and gave me my name – 'Scotch' – to go with his.

Curreri retained the name for 22 years, even when he fought under new manager, Jimmy Johnston.

Sports writer, and cartoonist, Hype Igoe, also bestowed the lasting moniker, "The Little Bar of Iron," on Curreri, in homage to his durability.

=== Early career ===
Dundee fought his first fight at Sharkey Athletic Club, on 65th Street and Broadway. He fought under the name "Young Marino." His opponent was "Skinny Bob."

In 1913, Dundee earned a world title fight in his 87th fight. He fought 20 rounds against World Featherweight champion, Johnny Kilbane in Vernon, California. The fight ended in a draw. Dundee would not be afforded an opportunity to fight for the 126-pound featherweight title again for another 10 years.

=== Junior Lightweight and Featherweight champion ===
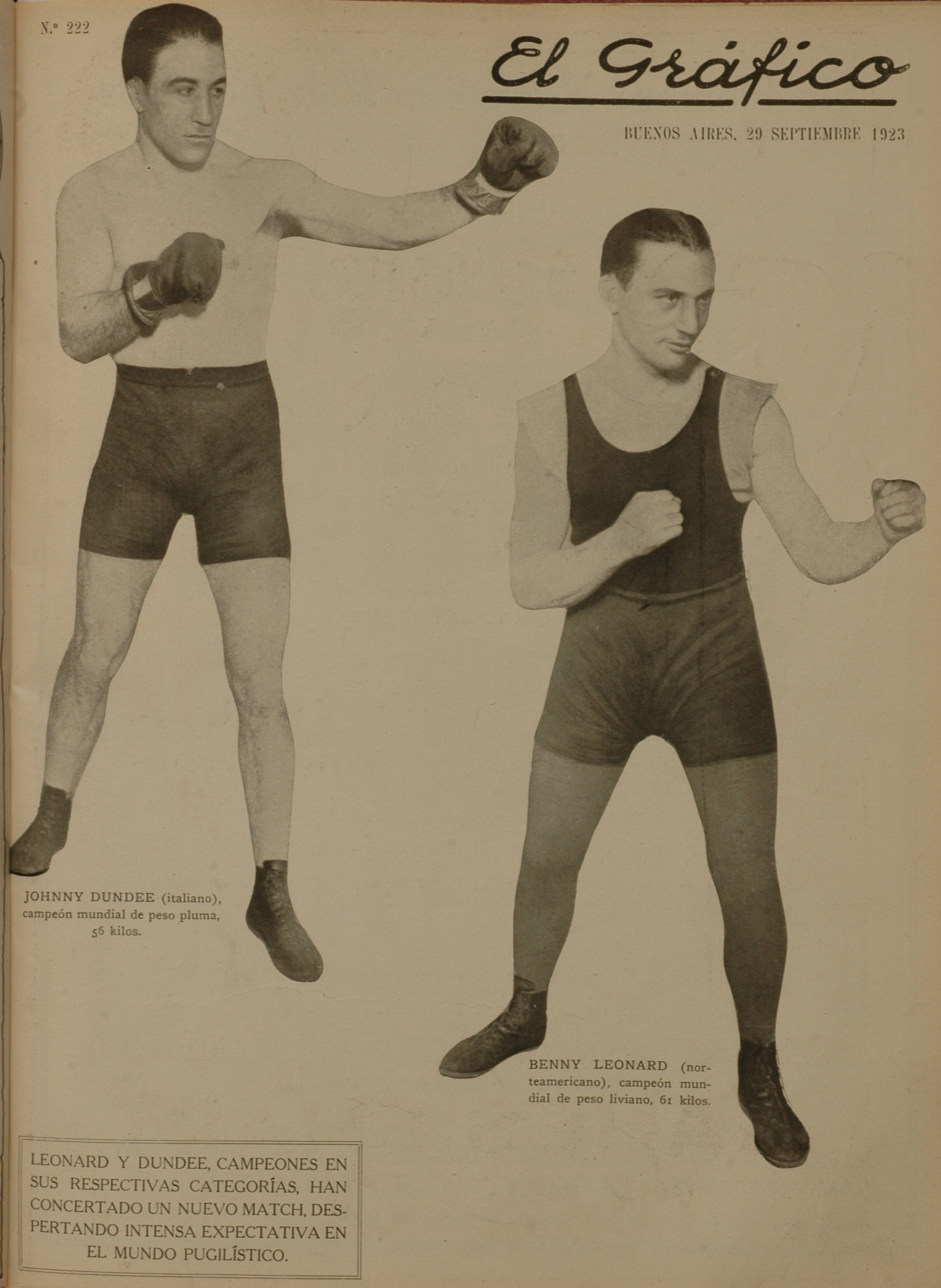
Johnny Dundee and Benny Leonard in 1923.

Dundee's loss (in a 15-round decision) to Joe Welling was the first bout to be held after New York enacted the Walker Law, which renewed legal professional boxing, set a 15-round maximum for fights, and created the various weight classes for bouts.

In 1921, Dundee won the junior lightweight championship when his opponent, George "KO" Chaney, was disqualified in the fifth round. The win made Dundee the first universally recognized junior lightweight champion in history.

A year later, Dundee knocked out Danny Frush. Following the win, he was recognized, in New York State, as the featherweight champion of the world.

On July 6, 1922, Dundee defeated "Little" Jackie Sharkey by unanimous decision in a fifteen-round Junior Lightweight title bout at Ebbets Field in Brooklyn. Sharkey was briefly down in the fourth round, and again in the fifteenth. Though the fight was close Dundee won "by a shade". He was criticized for the fight with the New York Evening World writing that Dundee was "losing his fighting fire" by allowing the bout to go fifteen rounds.

Dundee successfully defended his junior lightweight crown three times before losing it to Jack Bernstein on May 30, 1923. They fought at the Coney Island Velodrome, in front of a crowd of 15,000. Dundee was expected to win; however, he lost a unanimous fifteen-round decision despite knocking Bernstein down in the third round.

Less than two months later, Dundee was given the opportunity to fight featherweight champion, and war hero, Eugene Criqui. He lost 28 pounds in four weeks in order to fight him, making 126 pounds on the days of the fight. Criqui had beaten Johnny Kilbane two days after Dundee's fight with Bernstein, with a sixth-round knockout. However, part of the contract for this fight required that he give Dundee a shot at the title within sixty days. Fifty-four days later, on July 26, 1923, Dundee fought Criqui. He knocked him down four times and beat him by a fifteen-round decision.

==== Controversial decision ====
On December 17, 1923, Dundee fought Jack Bernstein again at Madison Square Garden. The fight ended in a Split Decision. Several newspapers, including the New York Times, wrote that the judges made the wrong decision. Author Ken Blady wrote that several of the judges may have been influenced to vote against Bernstein. The Milwaukee Sentinel echoed by printing "By probably the worst decision in local boxing history, Johnny Dundee of Jersey City regained his Junior Lightweight championship from Jack Bernstein."

In contrast, the Milwaukee Journal noted that Dundee finished strong in the bout, and agreed with the decision. The paper also noted "the sentiment of the crowd, based on the fighters' round by round showing, was that Bernstein had won easily."

With the win, Dundee had unified the featherweight title and the junior lightweight title.

=== Later career ===
Less than a year after unifying the title, Dundee lost the junior lightweight title to Steve "Kid" Sullivan on June 20, 1924. He then relinquished the featherweight crown, on August 10, 1924, at his manager's urging because he had outgrown (in weight) the 126 pound weight limit.

The last significant fight of his career was in 1927 when he challenged featherweight champion Tony Canzoneri, but lost a 15-round decision.

After a three-year retirement, Dundee tried to stage a comeback in 1932. However, two fights into it, he officially retired after posting a six-round decision win over Mickey Greb, and a 10th round lost to Al Dunbar.

=== Style ===
In 1965, Al del Greco wrote that Dundee was regarded as a "good southpaw craftsman."

Johnny Dundee wasn't the greatest little man in boxing, but he was good, very good...no one could come off the ropes like him. Rivals backed away when Johnny sidles backward because he bounced off at the craziest angles.

Local New York boxing legend, Johnny Martin, said of Dundee:

You threw your arms out trying to hit Johnny. When he was moving right, you lowered your eyes a bit, threw a punch, and the next thing you knew, he was behind you, laughing his head off. He was nothing as a hitter, but he could box your ears off. The big idea when you fought Johnny was not too appear too ridiculous.

=== Record ===
Dundee fought 321 fights. He won 35 percent of his fights, 6 percent ended in knock outs, 10 percent were losses and five percent were draws. Fifty percent (159) were No Decisions.

In 1957, Dundee was voted into the Boxing Hall of Fame.

== Personal life ==
Dundee married a woman named Lucille on June 26, 1912. They lived at 301 W. 40th Street and had a daughter, also named Lucille, born in 1913.

After beating Frankie Callahan over 10 rounds, on March 16, 1915, the next day, Dundee filed a petition to divorce Lucille, claiming she "beat him up":

Almost daily between February 1st and March 10 she walloped me. It is unsafe for me to try to live with her anymore.

Several days later, his wife countersued on the grounds of his "uncontrollable temper." His wife claimed he knocked her unconscious six months into their marriage, and would often hit himself in the head with a pair of shoes, to the point of drawing blood. She also claimed he was a philanderer, and that when he left her he gave her a "farewell beating."

== Death ==
On April 9, 1965, Dundee was admitted to East Orange General Hospital in New Jersey. He died thirteen days later of a respiratory infection complicated by pneumonia.

Dundee, who had become a successful businessman after boxing, left an estate valued at $300,000 ($2.4 million in 2018).

== Legacy ==
Dundee faced many great fighters in the featherweight, junior-lightweight, and lightweight divisions of his era including Benny Leonard (nine times), Lew Tendler (three times), and lightweight champions Freddie Welsh and Willie Ritchie. Dundee was knocked out only twice in his career – in 1917, he was knocked out in the first round by Willie Jackson in Philadelphia, and in 1929, he was knocked out in Montreal by Al Foreman in the 10th round.

Dundee was regarded as a skillful boxer with great footwork. Though he had little knockout power, he was widely regarded as being highly skilled at fighting off the ropes.

Statistical boxing website BoxRec lists Dundee as the #3 ranked featherweight of all time, while The Ring Magazine founder Nat Fleischer placed him at #4. The International Boxing Research Organization rates Dundee as the 5th best featherweight boxer ever and boxing historian Bert Sugar placed him 32nd in his Top 100 Fighters catalogue.

During his career he had 331 bouts. Only two fighters in history, Len Wickwar (463) and Jack Britton (350), had more fights.

Dundee was known to be highly regarded among the boxing community and his peers:

Johnny Dundee was strictly a product of a generation that has long since passed and will not return. He was a fighter in the era when boxing was in full flower, a superior craftsman among a lot of other superior craftsmen. Although he was once the featherweight champion of the world, he gained far more fame than fortune. When he died the other day, at the age of 74, the main legacy he left was the enduring friendships that this popular and amiable little guy collected over the years.

— San Antonio Express, 1965

== Professional boxing record ==
All information in this section is derived from BoxRec, unless otherwise stated.

=== Official record ===
334 fights	84 wins	31 losses
By knockout	17	2
By decision	66	29
By disqualification	1	0
Draws	20	
No contests	14	
Newspaper decisions/draws	185	

All newspaper decisions are officially regarded as “no decision” bouts and are not counted in the win/loss/draw column.

No.	Result	Record	Opponent	Type	Round	Date	Location	Notes
334	Win	84–31–20 (199)	Mickey Greb	PTS	6	Dec 6, 1932	Orange, New Jersey, U.S.	
333	Loss	83–31–20 (199)	Al Dunbar	PTS	10	Aug 25, 1932	Fort Hamilton Arena, New York City, New York, U.S.	
332	Loss	83–30–20 (199)	George Goldberg	PTS	10	Nov 12, 1929	Broadway Arena, New York City, New York, U.S.	
331	Win	83–29–20 (199)	Al Goldberg	PTS	10	Oct 8, 1929	Uptown Lenox S.C., New York City, New York, U.S.	
330	Loss	82–29–20 (199)	Al Foreman	TKO	10 (10)	Sep 25, 1929	Forum, Montreal, Quebec, Canada	
329	Win	82–28–20 (199)	Eddie Martin	PTS	10	Jul 8, 1929	Dexter Park Arena, Woodhaven, New York City, New York, U.S.	
328	Loss	81–28–20 (199)	Eddie Wolfe	PTS	10	Apr 22, 1929	Heinemann Park, New Orleans, Louisiana, U.S.	
327	Loss	81–27–20 (199)	Joey Manuel	PTS	10	Apr 8, 1929	Convention Hall, Rochester, New York, U.S.	
326	Win	81–26–20 (199)	San Sanchez	KO	3 (10)	Mar 23, 1929	Olympia A.C., New York City, New York, U.S.	
325	Win	80–26–20 (199)	Lou Moscowitz	PTS	10	Feb 12, 1929	Uptown Lenox S.C., New York City, New York, U.S.	
324	Win	79–26–20 (199)	Antoine Ascencio	PTS	10	Feb 4, 1929	Arena, Philadelphia, Pennsylvania, U.S.	
323	Loss	78–26–20 (199)	Frankie Garcia	SD	10	Jan 22, 1929	South Main Street Armory, Wilkes-Barre, Pennsylvania, U.S.	
322	Loss	78–25–20 (199)	Charley Phil Rosenberg	PTS	10	Jan 4, 1929	Madison Square Garden, New York City, New York, U.S.	
321	Loss	78–24–20 (199)	Jackie Pilkington	PTS	10	Dec 3, 1928	Arena, New Haven, Connecticut, U.S.	
320	Draw	78–23–20 (199)	Billy Kowalik	PTS	6	Nov 23, 1928	Broadway Auditorium, Buffalo, New York City, New York, U.S.	
319	Win	78–23–19 (199)	Gaston Charles	PTS	10	Nov 12, 1928	Broadway Arena, New York City, New York, U.S.	
318	Loss	77–23–19 (199)	Tony Canzoneri	UD	15	Oct 24, 1927	Recreation Park, San Francisco, California, U.S.	For vacant NBA and The Ring featherweight titles
317	Loss	77–22–19 (199)	Tod Morgan	PTS	10	Oct 19, 1926	Recreation Park, San Francisco, California, U.S.	For NYSAC, NBA, and The Ring super-featherweight titles
316	Win	77–21–19 (199)	Fred Bretonnel	PTS	10	Aug 20, 1926	Ebbets Field, New York City, New York, U.S.	
315	Loss	76–21–19 (199)	Hilario Martínez	PTS	12	Mar 3, 1926	Arena Colon, Havana, Cuba	
314	Loss	76–20–19 (199)	Joe Glick	PTS	10	Jan 29, 1926	Madison Square Garden, New YorkCity, New York, U.S.	
313	Win	76–19–19 (199)	Allentown Johnny Leonard	PTS	10	Jul 20, 1925	Queensboro Stadium, Long Island City, New York City, New York, U.S.	
312	Loss	75–19–19 (199)	Sid Terris	PTS	15	Jun 12, 1925	Coney Island Stadium, New York City, New York, U.S.	
311	Loss	75–18–19 (199)	Sid Terris	PTS	12	May 5, 1925	Madison Square Garden, New York City, New York, U.S.	
310	Loss	75–17–19 (199)	Dick Finnegan	PTS	10	Apr 28, 1925	Auditorium, Washington, D.C., U.S.	
309	Loss	75–16–19 (199)	Red Chapman	PTS	10	Mar 23, 1925	Mechanics Building, Boston, Massachusetts, U.S.	
308	Loss	75–15–19 (199)	Charlie O'Connell	PTS	12	Oct 22, 1924	Public Hall, Cleveland, Ohio, U.S.	
307	Loss	75–14–19 (199)	Jack Bernstein	PTS	15	Sep 15, 1924	Queensboro Stadium, Long Island City, New York City, New York, U.S.	
306	Loss	75–13–19 (199)	Steve Sullivan	PTS	10	Jun 20, 1924	Henderson's Bowl, New York City, New York, U.S.	Lost NYSAC super-featherweight title; For inaugural The Ring super-featherweight title
305	Loss	75–12–19 (199)	Sammy Mandell	NWS	10	Jun 9, 1924	Open-air Arena, East Chicago, Indiana, U.S.	
304	Win	75–12–19 (198)	Luis Vicentini	PTS	12	Jun 2, 1924	Madison Square Garden, New York City, New York, U.S.	
303	Loss	74–12–19 (198)	Willie Ames	NWS	12	Apr 28, 1924	Broadway Auditorium, Buffalo, New York, U.S.	
302	Loss	74–12–19 (197)	Rocky Kansas	UD	10	Apr 21, 1924	Broadway Auditorium, Buffalo, New York, U.S.	
301	Win	74–11–19 (197)	Pal Moran	PTS	15	Feb 1, 1924	Madison Square Garden, New York City, New York, U.S.	
300	Win	73–11–19 (197)	Jack Bernstein	SD	15	Dec 17, 1923	Madison Square Garden, New York City, New York, U.S.	Won NYSAC super-featherweight title
299	Loss	72–11–19 (197)	Sid Barbarian	NWS	10	Dec 4, 1923	Arena Gardens, Detroit, Michigan, U.S.	
298	Loss	72–11–19 (196)	Al Shubert	PTS	10	Nov 29, 1923	Elm Rink, New Bedford, Massachusetts, U.S.	
297	Loss	72–10–19 (196)	Eddie Wagner	NWS	8	Aug 27, 1923	Shetzline Ballpark, Philadelphia, Pennsylvania, U.S.	
296	Win	72–10–19 (195)	Eugène Criqui	PTS	15	Jul 26, 1923	Polo Grounds, New York City, New York, U.S.	Won NYSAC featherweight title
295	Win	71–10–19 (195)	Richie Mitchell	NWS	10	Jun 12, 1923	Auditorium, Milwaukee, Wisconsin, U.S.	
294	Loss	71–10–19 (194)	Jack Bernstein	UD	15	May 30, 1923	Coney Island Velodrome, New York City, New York, U.S.	Lost NYSAC super-featherweight title
293	Win	71–9–19 (194)	Jimmy Brady	UD	12	May 18, 1923	Armouries, Windsor, Ontario, Canada	
292	Win	70–9–19 (194)	Gene Delmont	PTS	12	Apr 23, 1923	Coliseum, Toronto, Ontario, Canada	
291	Win	69–9–19 (194)	Tony Vaccarelli	PTS	4	Mar 28, 1923	Rink S.C., New York City, New York, U.S.	
290	Draw	68–9–19 (194)	Basil Galiano	PTS	10	Feb 20, 1923	Louisiana Auditorium, New Orleans, Louisiana, U.S.	
289	Loss	68–9–18 (194)	Tony Julian	PTS	10	Feb 6, 1923	Mechanics Building, Boston, Massachusetts, U.S.	
288	Win	68–8–18 (194)	Elino Flores	UD	15	Feb 2, 1923	Madison Square Garden, New York City, New York, U.S.	Retained NYSAC super-featherweight title
287	Win	67–8–18 (194)	Vincent Martin	PTS	10	Jan 19, 1923	Mechanics Building, Boston, Massachusetts, U.S.	
286	Win	66–8–18 (194)	Tommy O'Brien	NWS	10	Dec 29, 1922	Auditorium, Milwaukee, Wisconsin, U.S.	
285	Win	66–8–18 (193)	Gene Delmont	PTS	12	Dec 14, 1922	Clermont Avenue Rink, New York City, New York, U.S.	
284	Win	65–8–18 (193)	Willie Doyle	NWS	12	Dec 5, 1922	Broad A.C., Newark, New Jersey, U.S.	
283	Loss	65–8–18 (192)	Alex Hart	NWS	8	Nov 30, 1922	Arena, Philadelphia, Pennsylvania, U.S.	
282	Win	65–8–18 (191)	Phil Delmont	PTS	12	Nov 27, 1922	Broadway Arena, New York City, New York, U.S.	
281	Win	64–8–18 (191)	Vincent Martin	UD	15	Aug 28, 1922	Velodrome, New York City, New York, U.S.	Retained NYSAC super-featherweight title
280	Win	63–8–18 (191)	Danny Frush	KO	9 (15)	Aug 15, 1922	Ebbets Field, New York City, New York, U.S.	Won vacant NYSAC featherweight title
279	Win	62–8–18 (191)	Henry Koster	NWS	12	Jul 28, 1922	City Auditorium, Houston, Texas, U.S.	
278	Win	62–8–18 (190)	Shamus O'Brien	PTS	4	Jul 12, 1922	Queensboro Stadium, Long Island City, New York City, New York, U.S.	
277	Win	61–8–18 (190)	Jackie Sharkey	UD	15	Jul 6, 1922	Ebbets Field, New York City, New York, U.S.	Retained NYSAC super-featherweight title
276	Loss	60–8–18 (190)	Charley White	NWS	10	Jun 27, 1922	Rock Island, Illinois, U.S.	
275	Loss	60–8–18 (189)	Lew Tendler	UD	15	May 5, 1922	Madison Square Garden, New York City, New York, U.S.	
274	Loss	60–7–18 (189)	Johnny Shugrue	PTS	10	Apr 19, 1922	Worcester, Massachusetts, U.S.	
273	Win	60–6–18 (189)	Jimmy Goodrich	SD	10	Apr 4, 1922	Civic Arena, Toronto, Ontario, Canada	
272	Win	59–6–18 (189)	Charley White	PTS	15	Mar 17, 1922	Madison Square Garden, New York City, New York, U.S.	
271	NC	58–6–18 (189)	Jimmy Hanlon	NC	6 (10)	Feb 24, 1922	Town Hall, Scranton, Pennsylvania, U.S.	The referee halted this bout, claiming the men were not trying
270	Win	58–6–18 (188)	Johnny Darcy	PTS	10	Feb 17, 1922	Infantry Hall, Providence, Rhode Island, U.S.	
269	Win	57–6–18 (188)	Joe Benjamin	PTS	15	Feb 3, 1922	Madison Square Garden, New York City, New York, U.S.	
268	Win	56–6–18 (188)	Frankie Rice	PTS	12	Jan 26, 1922	4th Regiment Armory, Baltimore, Maryland, U.S.	
267	Loss	55–6–18 (188)	Charley White	SD	10	Jan 16, 1922	Mechanics Building, Boston, Massachusetts, U.S.	
266	Win	55–5–18 (188)	Whitey Fitzgerald	NWS	8	Jan 10, 1922	Ice Palace, Philadelphia, Pennsylvania, U.S.	
265	Draw	55–5–18 (187)	Willie Jackson	PTS	15	Dec 30, 1921	Madison Square Garden, New York City, New York, U.S.	
264	Win	55–5–17 (187)	Jimmy Hanlon	NWS	8	Dec 19, 1921	Olympia A.C., Philadelphia, Pennsylvania, U.S.	
263	Win	55–5–17 (186)	Harry Brown	NWS	8	Dec 12, 1921	Olympia A.C., Philadelphia, Pennsylvania, U.S.	
262	Win	55–5–17 (185)	Eddie Wallace	PTS	12	Nov 28, 1921	Broadway Arena, New York City, New York, U.S.	
261	Win	54–5–17 (185)	George Chaney	DQ	5 (15)	Nov 18, 1921	Madison Square Garden, New York City, New York, U.S.	Won inaugural NYSAC super-featherweight title
260	Win	53–5–17 (185)	Blockie Richards	PTS	12	Oct 3, 1921	Triangle Park, Dayton, Ohio, U.S.	
259	Win	52–5–17 (185)	Joe Tiplitz	PTS	10	Sep 19, 1921	Arena, Boston, Massachusetts, U.S.	
258	Win	51–5–17 (185)	Joe Tiplitz	NWS	8	Aug 24, 1921	Shibe Park, Philadelphia, Pennsylvania, U.S.	
257	Draw	51–5–17 (184)	Charley White	PTS	10	Aug 10, 1921	Boxing Drome, New York City, New York, U.S.	
256	Win	51–5–16 (184)	Eddie Wallace	PTS	12	Aug 1, 1921	Chadwick Park, Albany, New York, U.S.	
255	Win	50–5–16 (184)	Bert Spencer	TKO	9 (12)	Jul 29, 1921	Broadway Arena, New York City, New York, U.S.	
254	Win	49–5–16 (184)	George Chaney	NWS	8	Jul 18, 1921	Shibe Park, Philadelphia, Pennsylvania, U.S.	
253	Win	49–5–16 (183)	Jimmy Hanlon	PTS	12	Jun 15, 1921	Pioneer Sporting Club, New York City, New York, U.S.	
252	Win	48–5–16 (183)	George Chaney	PTS	10	Jun 10, 1921	Mechanics Building, Boston, Massachusetts, U.S.	
251	Draw	47–5–16 (183)	Sailor Friedman	NWS	10	May 27, 1921	Twin City A.C., East Chicago, Indiana, U.S.	
250	Loss	47–5–16 (182)	Johnny Ray	NWS	10	May 21, 1921	Forbes Field, Pittsburgh, Pennsylvania, U.S.	
249	Win	47–5–16 (181)	Rocky Kansas	NWS	10	Apr 26, 1921	Auditorium, Milwaukee, Wisconsin, U.S.	
248	Draw	47–5–16 (180)	Johnny Ray	NWS	10	Apr 11, 1921	Motor Square Garden, Pittsburgh, Pennsylvania, U.S.	
247	Loss	47–5–16 (179)	Willie Jackson	PTS	15	Feb 25, 1921	Madison Square Garden, New York City, New York, U.S.	
246	Draw	47–4–16 (179)	Pal Moran	PTS	15	Dec 20, 1920	Pilsbury Winter Gardens, New Orleans, Louisiana, U.S.	
245	Draw	47–4–15 (179)	Willie Jackson	MD	15	Nov 29, 1920	Manhattan Casino, New York City, New York, U.S.	
244	Loss	47–4–14 (179)	Joe Welling	PTS	15	Sep 17, 1920	Madison Square Garden, New York City, New York, U.S.	
243	Draw	47–3–14 (179)	Eddie Fitzsimmons	NWS	10	Jul 26, 1920	1st Regiment Armory, Newark, New Jersey, U.S.	
242	Win	47–3–14 (178)	Johnny Downes	PTS	12	Jul 13, 1920	Mechanics Building, Boston, Massachusetts, U.S.	
241	Draw	46–3–14 (178)	Young George Erne	PTS	12	Jun 25, 1920	2nd Regiment Armory, Trenton, New Jersey, U.S.	
240	Draw	46–3–13 (178)	Willie Jackson	PTS	12	Jun 14, 1920	Mechanics Building, Boston, Massachusetts, U.S.	
239	Win	46–3–12 (178)	Billy DeFoe	NWS	8	Jun 7, 1920	Shibe Park, Philadelphia, Pennsylvania, U.S.	
238	Win	46–3–12 (177)	Jack Lawler	PTS	12	May 29, 1920	Cuddy's Arena, Lawrence, Massachusetts, U.S.	
237	Draw	45–3–12 (177)	Mel Coogan	NWS	10	May 19, 1920	Navin Field, Detroit, Michigan, U.S.	
236	Loss	45–3–12 (176)	Willie Jackson	NWS	12	May 14, 1920	1st Regiment Armory, Newark, New Jersey, U.S.	
235	Loss	45–3–12 (175)	Joe Welling	NWS	12	Apr 23, 1920	Neil Park, Columbus, Ohio, U.S.	
234	Loss	45–3–12 (174)	Willie Jackson	NWS	8	Mar 8, 1920	4th Regiment Armory, Jersey City, New Jersey, U.S.	
233	Draw	45–3–12 (173)	Jack Lawler	PTS	10	Feb 20, 1920	Auditorium, Atlanta, Georgia, U.S.	
232	Loss	45–3–11 (173)	Benny Leonard	NWS	8	Feb 9, 1920	4th Regiment Armory, Jersey City, New Jersey, U.S.	
231	Win	45–3–11 (172)	Pal Moran	NWS	6	Dec 15, 1919	Olympia A.C., Philadelphia, Pennsylvania, U.S.	
230	Win	45–3–11 (171)	Charley White	NWS	10	Nov 26, 1919	Auditorium, Milwaukee, Wisconsin, U.S.	
229	Loss	45–3–11 (170)	Mel Coogan	NWS	8	Nov 10, 1919	4th Regiment Armory, Jersey City, New Jersey, U.S.	
228	Win	45–3–11 (169)	Tommy Touhey	TKO	5 (8)	Nov 4, 1919	1st Regiment Armory, Newark, New Jersey, U.S.	
227	Win	44–3–11 (169)	Willie Jackson	NWS	10	Oct 31, 1919	Auditorium, Milwaukee, Wisconsin, U.S.	
226	Win	44–3–11 (168)	Young Kloby	PTS	12	Oct 13, 1919	West Street Rink, Lawrence, Massachusetts, U.S.	
225	Win	43–3–11 (168)	Eddie Moy	NWS	6	Sep 27, 1919	National A.C., Philadelphia, Pennsylvania, U.S.	
224	Win	43–3–11 (167)	Charlie Parker	PTS	12	Sep 23, 1919	Mechanics Building, Boston, Massachusetts, U.S.	
223	Loss	42–3–11 (167)	Benny Leonard	NWS	8	Sep 17, 1919	1st Regiment Armory, Newark, New Jersey, U.S.	
222	Win	42–3–11 (166)	Frankie Britt	PTS	12	Sep 10, 1919	Marieville Gardens, North Providence, Rhode Island, U.S.	
221	Loss	41–3–11 (166)	Willie Jackson	NWS	8	Sep 1, 1919	4th Regiment Armory, Jersey City, New Jersey, U.S.	
220	Win	41–3–11 (165)	Joe Welling	NWS	6	Aug 11, 1919	Shibe Park, Philadelphia, Pennsylvania, U.S.	
219	Loss	41–3–11 (164)	Mel Coogan	NWS	8	Aug 4, 1919	Open-Air Arena, Jersey City, New Jersey, U.S.	
218	Win	41–3–11 (163)	Joe Tiplitz	PTS	12	Jul 21, 1919	Park Riding Academy, Boston, Massachusetts, U.S.	
217	Win	40–3–11 (163)	Benny Valger	PTS	12	Jul 15, 1919	Mechanics Building, Boston, Massachusetts, U.S.	
216	Loss	39–3–11 (163)	Ralph Brady	NWS	10	Jun 30, 1919	Arena, Syracuse, New York, U.S.	
215	Loss	39–3–11 (162)	Benny Leonard	NWS	6	Jun 16, 1919	Shibe Park, Philadelphia, Pennsylvania, U.S.	
214	Win	39–3–11 (161)	Joe Tiplitz	NWS	6	Jun 4, 1919	Shibe Park, Philadelphia, Pennsylvania, U.S.	
213	Win	39–3–11 (160)	Frankie Britt	NWS	12	May 30, 1919	Exposition Building, Portland, Maine, U.S.	
212	Win	39–3–11 (159)	Billy Whelan	NWS	10	May 15, 1919	Auditorium, Saint Paul, Minnesota, U.S.	
211	Draw	39–3–11 (158)	Richie Mitchell	NWS	10	May 9, 1919	Auditorium, Milwaukee, Wisconsin, U.S.	
210	Win	39–3–11 (157)	Johnny Mealey	NWS	6	Mar 3, 1919	Olympia A.C., Philadelphia, Pennsylvania, U.S.	
209	Win	39–3–11 (156)	Johnny Ray	NWS	10	Feb 24, 1919	Duquesne Garden, Pittsburgh, Pennsylvania, U.S.	
208	Loss	39–3–11 (155)	Benny Leonard	NWS	8	Jan 20, 1919	1st Regiment Armory, Newark, New Jersey, U.S.	
207	Loss	39–3–11 (154)	Johnny Mealey	NWS	6	Dec 7, 1918	National A.C., Philadelphia, Pennsylvania, U.S.	
206	Loss	39–3–11 (153)	Joe Welling	PTS	12	Dec 3, 1918	Arena, Boston, Massachusetts, U.S.	
205	Win	39–2–11 (153)	Joe Phillips	NWS	6	Nov 28, 1918	National A.C., Philadelphia, Pennsylvania, U.S.	
204	Draw	39–2–11 (152)	Joe Welling	NWS	6	Nov 16, 1918	Madison Square Garden, New York City, New York, U.S.	
203	Win	39–2–11 (151)	Lou Bogash	NWS	6	Nov 13, 1918	State Armory, Bridgeport, Connecticut, U.S.	
202	Win	39–2–11 (150)	Gussie Lewis	NWS	6	Nov 6, 1918	Olympia A.C., Philadelphia, Pennsylvania, U.S.	
201	Win	39–2–11 (149)	Frankie Callahan	PTS	12	Oct 29, 1918	Arena, Boston, Massachusetts, U.S.	
200	Win	38–2–11 (149)	Frankie Britt	PTS	12	Sep 24, 1918	Arena, Boston, Massachusetts, U.S.	
199	Draw	37–2–11 (149)	Rocky Kansas	PTS	12	Sep 10, 1918	Arena, Boston, Massachusetts, U.S.	
198	Win	37–2–10 (149)	Tommy Touhey	NWS	8	Aug 19, 1918	Armory A.A., Jersey City, New Jersey, U.S.	
197	Draw	37–2–10 (148)	Frankie Britt	PTS	12	Aug 6, 1918	Arena, Boston, Massachusetts, U.S.	
196	Win	37–2–9 (148)	Mickey Donley	NWS	8	Jun 24, 1918	Open-Air Arena, Jersey City, New Jersey, U.S.	
195	Draw	37–2–9 (147)	Frankie Britt	PTS	12	Jun 18, 1918	Arena, Boston, Massachusetts, U.S.	
194	Win	37–2–8 (147)	Billy DeFoe	PTS	12	Jun 3, 1918	Arena, New Haven, Connecticut, U.S.	
193	Win	36–2–8 (147)	Eddie Morgan	NWS	6	May 27, 1918	Olympia A.C., Philadelphia, Pennsylvania, U.S.	
192	Draw	36–2–8 (146)	Willie Jackson	PTS	12	Mar 25, 1918	Arena, New Haven, Connecticut, U.S.	
191	Win	36–2–7 (146)	Harry Carlson	PTS	12	Mar 12, 1918	Arena, Boston, Massachusetts, U.S.	
190	Win	35–2–7 (146)	George Chaney	NWS	6	Mar 9, 1918	National A.C., Philadelphia, Pennsylvania, U.S.	
189	Draw	35–2–7 (145)	Patsy Cline	PTS	20	Feb 11, 1918	Louisiana Auditorium, New Orleans, Louisiana, U.S.	
188	Win	35–2–6 (145)	Pal Moran	PTS	20	Jan 14, 1918	Dauphine Theater, New Orleans, Louisiana, U.S.	
187	Win	34–2–6 (145)	Battling Kunz	TKO	5 (12)	Dec 10, 1917	Casino Hall, Bridgeport, Connecticut, U.S.	
186	Draw	33–2–6 (145)	Johnny Ray	NWS	6	Dec 8, 1917	National A.C., Philadelphia, Pennsylvania, U.S.	
185	Win	33–2–6 (144)	Eddie Shannon	TKO	7 (12)	Nov 29, 1917	Unity Cycle Club, Lawrence, Massachusetts, U.S.	
184	Win	32–2–6 (144)	Frankie Britt	PTS	12	Nov 20, 1917	Arena, Boston, Massachusetts, U.S.	
183	Win	31–2–6 (144)	George Chaney	NWS	6	Nov 19, 1917	Olympia A.C., Philadelphia, Pennsylvania, U.S.	
182	Win	31–2–6 (143)	Philadelphia Pal Moore	NWS	10	Nov 6, 1917	Pioneer Sporting Club, New York City, New York, U.S.	
181	Win	31–2–6 (142)	Westside Jimmy Duffy	NWS	10	Oct 30, 1917	Pioneer S.C., New York City, New York, U.S.	
180	Loss	31–2–6 (141)	Patsy Cline	NWS	10	Oct 9, 1917	Manhattan Casino, New York City, New York, U.S.	
179	Loss	31–2–6 (140)	Lew Tendler	NWS	6	Oct 1, 1917	Olympia A.C., Philadelphia, Pennsylvania, U.S.	
178	Win	31–2–6 (139)	Joe Mooney	NWS	10	Sep 20, 1917	St. Nicholas Arena, New York City, New York, U.S.	
177	Win	31–2–6 (138)	Pete Hartley	PTS	12	Sep 18, 1917	Arena, Boston, Massachusetts, U.S.	
176	Win	30–2–6 (138)	Johnny Russell	NWS	6	Sep 12, 1917	Fairmont A.C., New York City, New York, U.S.	
175	Win	30–2–6 (137)	Johnny Mealey	NWS	6	Aug 22, 1917	Shibe Park, Philadelphia, Pennsylvania, U.S.	
174	Win	30–2–6 (136)	Tommy Touhey	NWS	10	Jul 24, 1917	Pioneer S.C., New York City, New York, U.S.	
173	Loss	30–2–6 (135)	Joe Welling	NWS	10	Jul 20, 1917	St. Nicholas Arena, New York City, New York, U.S.	
172	Draw	30–2–6 (134)	George Chaney	NWS	6	Jul 12, 1917	Shibe Park, Philadelphia, Pennsylvania, U.S.	
171	Win	30–2–6 (133)	Willie Jackson	NWS	10	Jun 29, 1917	St. Nicholas Arena, New York City, New York, U.S.	
170	Win	30–2–6 (132)	Frankie Callahan	PTS	12	Jun 12, 1917	Arena, Boston, Massachusetts, U.S.	
169	Win	29–2–6 (132)	Joe Welling	NWS	10	Jun 7, 1917	St. Nicholas Arena, New York City, New York, U.S.	
168	Win	29–2–6 (131)	Rocky Kansas	PTS	12	May 29, 1917	Arena, Boston, Massachusetts, U.S.	
167	Win	28–2–6 (131)	Chick Simler	PTS	12	May 15, 1917	Arena, Boston, Massachusetts, U.S.	
166	Win	27–2–6 (131)	Chick Simler	PTS	12	May 1, 1917	Grand Opera House, Boston, Massachusetts, U.S.	
165	Win	26–2–6 (131)	Tommy Touhey	NWS	10	Apr 24, 1917	Broadway S.C., New York City, New York, U.S.	
164	Win	26–2–6 (130)	Johnny Mealey	NWS	6	Apr 16, 1917	Olympia A.C., Philadelphia, Pennsylvania, U.S.	
163	Win	26–2–6 (129)	Jimmy Powers	KO	9 (10)	Apr 10, 1917	Pioneer S.C., New York City, New York, U.S.	
162	Loss	25–2–6 (129)	Lew Tendler	NWS	6	Mar 26, 1917	Olympia A.C., Philadelphia, Pennsylvania, U.S.	
161	Win	25–2–6 (128)	Westside Jimmy Duffy	NWS	10	Mar 6, 1917	Pioneer S.C., New York City, New York, U.S.	
160	Win	25–2–6 (127)	Young Terry McGovern	NWS	6	Mar 5, 1917	Olympia A.C., Philadelphia, Pennsylvania, U.S.	
159	Loss	25–2–6 (126)	Frankie Callahan	NWS	10	Feb 20, 1917	Broadway S.C., New York City, New York, U.S.	
158	Win	25–2–6 (125)	Jimmy Hanlon	PTS	20	Jan 29, 1917	Tulane Arena, New Orleans, Louisiana, U.S.	
157	Loss	24–2–6 (125)	Willie Jackson	KO	1 (6)	Jan 15, 1917	Olympia A.C., Philadelphia, Pennsylvania, U.S.	
156	Win	24–1–6 (125)	Buck Fleming	NWS	6	Dec 18, 1916	Olympia A.C., Philadelphia, Pennsylvania, U.S.	
155	Draw	24–1–6 (124)	Johnny Tillman	NWS	6	Dec 4, 1916	Olympia A.C., Philadelphia, Pennsylvania, U.S.	
154	Win	24–1–6 (123)	Eddie Wallace	NWS	10	Nov 30, 1916	Broadway Arena, New York City, New York, U.S.	
153	Win	24–1–6 (122)	Benny Leonard	NWS	6	Nov 15, 1916	Olympia A.C., Philadelphia, Pennsylvania, U.S.	
152	Win	24–1–6 (121)	Jimmy Hanlon	NWS	12	Oct 17, 1916	Future City A.C., Saint Louis, Missouri, U.S.	
151	Win	24–1–6 (120)	Ever Hammer	PTS	15	Sep 11, 1916	Convention Hall, Kansas City, Missouri, U.S.	
150	Win	23–1–6 (120)	Joe Welling	NWS	10	Aug 30, 1916	Madison Square Garden, New York City, New York, U.S.	
149	Win	23–1–6 (119)	Johnny O'Leary	KO	9 (12)	Aug 15, 1916	Armory, Boston, Massachusetts, U.S.	
148	Win	22–1–6 (119)	Ever Hammer	NWS	10	Jul 4, 1916	Lovington Field, East Chicago, Indiana, U.S.	
147	Draw	22–1–6 (118)	Benny Leonard	NWS	10	Jun 12, 1916	Madison Square Garden, New York City, New York, U.S.	
146	Win	22–1–6 (117)	Eddie Wallace	NWS	12	May 30, 1916	Marieville Gardens, North Providence, Rhode Island, U.S.	
145	Win	22–1–6 (116)	Buck Fleming	NWS	6	May 22, 1916	Olympia A.C., Philadelphia, Pennsylvania, U.S.	
144	Win	22–1–6 (115)	Johnny O'Leary	NWS	10	May 17, 1916	Broadway Auditorium, Buffalo, New York, U.S.	
143	Win	22–1–6 (114)	Matt Wells	PTS	12	May 16, 1916	Arena, Boston, Massachusetts, U.S.	
142	Win	21–1–6 (114)	Phil Bloom	NWS	10	Apr 11, 1916	Broadway Arena, New York City, New York, U.S.	
141	Draw	21–1–6 (113)	Benny Leonard	NWS	10	Mar 8, 1916	Madison Square Garden, New York City, New York, U.S.	
140	Loss	21–1–6 (112)	Joe Mandot	PTS	20	Feb 21, 1916	Louisiana Auditorium, New Orleans, Louisiana, U.S.	
139	Win	21–0–6 (112)	Jimmy Murphy	NWS	6	Feb 7, 1916	Olympia A.C., Philadelphia, Pennsylvania, U.S.	
138	Win	21–0–6 (111)	Stanley Yoakum	PTS	20	Jan 22, 1916	Stockyards Stadium, Denver, Colorado, U.S.	
137	Win	20–0–6 (111)	Jimmy Murphy	NWS	6	Jan 10, 1916	Olympia A.C., Philadelphia, Pennsylvania, U.S.	
136	Win	20–0–6 (110)	Joe Azevedo	NWS	6	Jan 1, 1916	National A.C., Philadelphia, Pennsylvania, U.S.	
135	Win	20–0–6 (109)	Matt Wells	PTS	12	Dec 10, 1915	Italian Riverside Club, New Haven, Connecticut, U.S.	
134	Win	19–0–6 (109)	Phil Bloom	NWS	10	Dec 2, 1915	Pioneer Sporting Club, New York City, New York, U.S.	
133	Win	19–0–6 (108)	Phil Bloom	NWS	10	Nov 22, 1915	Clermont Avenue Rink, New York City, New York, U.S.	
132	Win	19–0–6 (107)	Mexican Joe Rivers	NWS	10	Nov 8, 1915	Auditorium, Milwaukee, Wisconsin, U.S.	
131	Win	19–0–6 (106)	Willie Ritchie	NWS	10	Oct 26, 1915	Madison Square Garden, New York City, New York, U.S.	
130	Draw	19–0–6 (105)	Joe Mandot	NWS	10	Sep 23, 1915	Ebbets Field, New York City, New York, U.S.	
129	Win	19–0–6 (104)	Richie Mitchell	NWS	10	Aug 30, 1915	Auditorium, Milwaukee, Wisconsin, U.S.	
128	Win	19–0–6 (103)	Mexican Joe Rivers	NWS	10	Jul 23, 1915	Ebbets Field, New York City, New York, U.S.	
127	Win	19–0–6 (102)	Leach Cross	NWS	10	Jun 18, 1915	Ebbets Field, New York City, New York, U.S.	
126	Win	19–0–6 (101)	Johnny Drummie	KO	2 (10)	May 31, 1915	Ebbets Field, New York City, New York, U.S.	
125	Win	18–0–6 (101)	Frankie Callahan	NWS	10	May 10, 1915	Joe Levy's Open Air Club, Cincinnati, Ohio, U.S.	
124	Win	18–0–6 (100)	Rocky Kansas	NWS	10	May 3, 1915	Broadway Auditorium, Buffalo, New York, U.S.	
123	Win	18–0–6 (99)	Frankie Callahan	NWS	10	Mar 30, 1915	Broadway Arena, New York City, New York, U.S.	
122	Win	18–0–6 (98)	Joe Azevedo	PTS	8	Mar 22, 1915	Phoenix A.C., Memphis, Tennessee, U.S.	
121	Win	17–0–6 (98)	Frankie Callahan	NWS	10	Mar 16, 1915	Broadway S.C., New York City, New York, U.S.	
120	Win	17–0–6 (97)	Benny Leonard	NWS	10	Mar 2, 1915	135th Street A.C., New York City, New York, U.S.	
119	Draw	17–0–6 (96)	Joe Mandot	PTS	20	Feb 14, 1915	McDonoughville Arena, New Orleans, Louisiana, U.S.	
118	Loss	17–0–5 (96)	Lockport Jimmy Duffy	NWS	10	Jan 15, 1915	Hippodrome, Milwaukee, Wisconsin, U.S.	
117	Win	17–0–5 (95)	Mexican Joe Rivers	PTS	20	Dec 8, 1914	Arena, Vernon, California, U.S.	
116	Draw	16–0–5 (95)	Willie Ritchie	PTS	4	Oct 23, 1914	Coffroth's Arena, Daly City, California, U.S.	
115	Win	16–0–4 (95)	Joe Azevedo	PTS	10	Oct 20, 1914	Piedmont Pavilion, Oakland, California, U.S.	
114	Draw	15–0–4 (95)	Willie Beecher	PTS	20	Sep 28, 1914	Arena, Vernon, California, U.S.	
113	Win	15–0–3 (95)	Grover Hayes	PTS	20	Jul 26, 1914	Arena, Ciudad Juarez, Chihuahua, Mexico	
112	Loss	14–0–3 (95)	Joe Mandot	NWS	10	Jul 4, 1914	Pelican Stadium, New Orleans, Louisiana, U.S.	
111	Win	14–0–3 (94)	Johnny Gallant	TKO	8 (12)	Jun 16, 1914	Arena, Boston, Massachusetts, U.S.	
110	Win	13–0–3 (94)	Willie Jones	NWS	10	May 16, 1914	Irving A.C., New York City, New York, U.S.	
109	Win	13–0–3 (93)	George Chaney	NWS	6	Apr 20, 1914	Olympia A.C., Philadelphia, Pennsylvania, U.S.	
108	Draw	13–0–3 (92)	Matty Baldwin	PTS	12	Apr 14, 1914	Arena, Boston, Massachusetts, U.S.	
107	Win	13–0–2 (92)	Charley Thomas	NWS	6	Apr 11, 1914	National A.C., Philadelphia, Pennsylvania, U.S.	
106	Win	13–0–2 (91)	Johnny Lustig	NWS	10	Mar 28, 1914	Irving A.C., New York City, New York, U.S.	
105	Win	13–0–2 (90)	Patsy Drouillard	PTS	8	Mar 25, 1914	Windsor, Ontario, Canada	
104	Draw	12–0–2 (90)	Eddie Wallace	NWS	10	Mar 21, 1914	Irving A.C., New York City, New York, U.S.	
103	Win	12–0–2 (89)	Special Delivery Hirsch	NWS	10	Mar 17, 1914	Atlantic Garden A.C., New York City, New York, U.S.	
102	Win	12–0–2 (88)	Eddie Moy	NWS	6	Feb 28, 1914	National A.C., Philadelphia, Pennsylvania, U.S.	
101	Win	12–0–2 (87)	Philadelphia Pal Moore	NWS	10	Feb 26, 1914	National S.C., New York City, New York, U.S.	
100	Loss	12–0–2 (86)	Rocky Kansas	NWS	10	Feb 24, 1914	Broadway Auditorium, Buffalo, New York, U.S.	
99	Win	12–0–2 (85)	Joe Shugrue	PTS	12	Feb 19, 1914	Auditorium, Waterbury, Connecticut, U.S.	
98	Win	11–0–2 (85)	Johnny Lore	NWS	10	Feb 6, 1914	Empire A.C., New Star Casino, New York City, New York, U.S.	
97	Win	11–0–2 (84)	Sapper Jack O'Neill	NWS	10	Jan 27, 1914	Madison Square Garden, New York City, New York, U.S.	
96	Win	11–0–2 (83)	Joe Shugrue	NWS	10	Jan 23, 1914	Empire A.C., New Star Casino, New York City, New York, U.S.	
95	Win	11–0–2 (82)	Johnny Reiss	NWS	3	Jan 10, 1914	Crescent A.C., New York City, New York, U.S.	
94	Loss	11–0–2 (81)	Freddie Welsh	NWS	10	Jan 1, 1914	Pelican Stadium, New Orleans, Louisiana, U.S.	
93	Draw	11–0–2 (80)	Johnny Griffiths	NWS	12	Dec 15, 1913	Civic Auditorium, Canton, Ohio, U.S.	
92	Win	11–0–2 (79)	Charley White	NWS	10	Nov 27, 1913	Pelican Stadium, New Orleans, Louisiana, U.S.	
91	Win	11–0–2 (78)	Joe Azevedo	PTS	20	Oct 14, 1913	Arena, Vernon, California, U.S.	
90	Win	10–0–2 (78)	Jack White	TKO	9 (20)	Aug 12, 1913	Arena, Vernon, California, U.S.	
89	Win	9–0–2 (78)	Tommy Dixon	PTS	10	Jul 4, 1913	Albuquerque, New Mexico, U.S.	
88	Win	8–0–2 (78)	Jack White	PTS	20	Jun 17, 1913	Arena, Vernon, California, U.S.	
87	Draw	7–0–2 (78)	Johnny Kilbane	PTS	20	Apr 29, 1913	Arena, Vernon, California, U.S.	For world featherweight title
86	Win	7–0–1 (78)	Special Delivery Hirsch	NWS	10	Jan 27, 1913	Olympia Boxing Club, New York City, New York, U.S.	
85	Win	7–0–1 (77)	Tommy Shea	NWS	12	Jan 23, 1913	Auditorium, Waterbury, Connecticut, U.S.	
84	Win	7–0–1 (76)	Willie Jones	NWS	10	Jan 22, 1913	Clermont Avenue Rink, New York City, New York, U.S.	
83	Win	7–0–1 (75)	Willie Jones	NWS	10	Jan 11, 1913	Clermont Avenue Rink, New York City, New York, U.S.	
82	Win	7–0–1 (74)	Eddie Morgan	NWS	10	Dec 19, 1912	44th Street A.C., New York City, New York, U.S.	
81	Win	7–0–1 (73)	Frankie Conley	TKO	19 (20)	Nov 19, 1912	Arena, Vernon, California, U.S.	
80	Win	6–0–1 (73)	Matt Brock	PTS	10	Oct 21, 1912	Orleans A.C., New Orleans, Louisiana, U.S.	
79	Loss	5–0–1 (73)	Philadelphia Pal Moore	NWS	10	Oct 11, 1912	St. Nicholas Arena, New York City, New York, U.S.	
78	Win	5–0–1 (72)	Harry Thomas	NWS	10	Sep 30, 1912	Madison Square Garden, New York City, New York, U.S.	
77	Win	5–0–1 (71)	George Kirkwood	NWS	10	Sep 25, 1912	St. Nicholas Arena, New York City, New York, U.S.	
76	Loss	5–0–1 (70)	Johnny Kilbane	NWS	10	Sep 4, 1912	St. Nicholas Arena, New York City, New York, U.S.	
75	Draw	5–0–1 (69)	Matt Brock	PTS	12	Aug 13, 1912	Luna Park Arena, Cleveland, Ohio, U.S.	
74	Win	5–0 (69)	Patsy Kline	NWS	10	Aug 7, 1912	St. Nicholas Arena, New York City, New York, U.S.	
73	Win	5–0 (68)	Ty Cobb	TKO	1 (10)	Jul 24, 1912	St. Nicholas Arena, New York City, New York, U.S.	
72	Draw	4–0 (68)	Joe Shugrue	NWS	10	Jul 1, 1912	Madison Square Garden, New York City, New York, U.S.	
71	Win	4–0 (67)	Young Wagner	NWS	10	Jun 18, 1912	St. Nicholas Arena, New York City, New York, U.S.	
70	Win	4–0 (66)	Packy Hommey	NWS	10	May 21, 1912	St. Nicholas Arena, New York City, New York, U.S.	
69	Loss	4–0 (65)	Charley White	NWS	10	Apr 30, 1912	Alhambra, Syracuse, New York, U.S.	
68	Win	4–0 (64)	Tommy Houck	NWS	10	Apr 10, 1912	Manhattan Casino, New York City, New York, U.S.	
67	Win	4–0 (63)	Young Wagner	NWS	10	Mar 27, 1912	Manhattan Casino, New York City, New York, U.S.	
66	Loss	4–0 (62)	Kid Julian	NWS	10	Mar 20, 1912	Alhambra, Syracuse, New York, U.S.	
65	Win	4–0 (61)	Young Abe Brown	NWS	10	Mar 16, 1912	Clermont Avenue Rink, New York City, New York, U.S.	
64	Draw	4–0 (60)	Tommy Houck	NWS	6	Mar 8, 1912	Nonpareil A.C., Philadelphia, Pennsylvania, U.S.	
63	Loss	4–0 (59)	Eddie O'Keefe	NWS	10	Mar 4, 1912	Manhattan Casino, New York City, New York, U.S.	
62	Win	4–0 (58)	Eddie O'Keefe	NWS	10	Feb 8, 1912	National S.C., New York City, New York, U.S.	
61	Win	4–0 (57)	Paddy Callahan	NWS	10	Jan 24, 1912	Long Acre A.A., New York City, New York, U.S.	
60	Draw	4–0 (56)	Ty Cobb	NWS	10	Jan 4, 1912	Fordon A.C., New York City, New York, U.S.	
59	Loss	4–0 (55)	Young Johnny Cohen	NWS	10	Dec 18, 1911	Fordon A.C., New York City, New York, U.S.	
58	Win	4–0 (54)	Young O'Leary	NWS	10	Dec 11, 1911	Fordon A.C., New York City, New York, U.S.	
57	Loss	4–0 (53)	Bobby Reynolds	NWS	6	Dec 2, 1911	National A.C., Philadelphia, Pennsylvania, U.S.	
56	Draw	4–0 (52)	Tommy O'Toole	NWS	6	Nov 30, 1911	National A.C., Philadelphia, Pennsylvania, U.S.	
55	Win	4–0 (51)	Young Abe Brown	NWS	10	Nov 22, 1911	Houston A.C., New York City, New York, U.S.	
54	Win	4–0 (50)	Tommy Houck	NWS	10	Nov 4, 1911	Olympic A.C., New York City, New York, U.S.	
53	Loss	4–0 (49)	Charley Thomas	NWS	6	Oct 28, 1911	National A.C., Philadelphia, Pennsylvania, U.S.	
52	Win	4–0 (48)	Harry Tracey	NWS	6	Oct 7, 1911	National A.C., Philadelphia, Pennsylvania, U.S.	
51	Win	4–0 (47)	Kid Ghetto	NWS	10	Sep 16, 1911	Fairmont A.C., New York City, New York, U.S.	
50	ND	4–0 (46)	Mike Malia	ND	10	Sep 9, 1911	Port Jervis, New York, U.S.	
49	Win	4–0 (45)	Ty Cobb	NWS	10	Aug 12, 1911	Fairmont A.C., New York City, New York, U.S.	
48	Win	4–0 (44)	Kid Black	NWS	10	Aug 5, 1911	Fairmont A.C., New York City, New York, U.S.	
47	Win	4–0 (43)	Joe Shugrue	NWS	10	Jul 29, 1911	Long Acre A.C., New York City, New York, U.S.	
46	Loss	4–0 (42)	Joe Shear	NWS	10	Jul 3, 1911	Olympic A.C., New York City, New York, U.S.	
45	Loss	4–0 (41)	Young Terry McGovern	NWS	6	Jun 13, 1911	Brown's Gym, New York City, New York, U.S.	
44	Win	4–0 (40)	Frankie Fleming	NWS	10	Jun 10, 1911	Fairmont A.C., New York City, New York, U.S.	
43	Win	4–0 (39)	Mike Mada	NWS	10	May 31, 1911	Port Jervis, New York, U.S.	
42	Draw	4–0 (38)	Joe Shugrue	NWS	6	May 15, 1911	Perth Amboy, New Jersey, U.S.	
41	Win	4–0 (37)	Mike Malia	NWS	6	May 5, 1911	National S.C., New York City, New York, U.S.	
40	Win	4–0 (36)	Kid Black	NWS	10	Apr 28, 1911	Prestone A.C., New York City, New York, U.S.	
39	Win	4–0 (35)	Babe Cullen	NWS	6	Apr 25, 1911	Brown's Gym, New York City, New York, U.S.	
38	Win	4–0 (34)	Joe Shear	NWS	6	Apr 17, 1911	Olympic A.C., New York City, New York, U.S.	
37	Loss	4–0 (33)	Kid Black	NWS	10	Mar 31, 1911	Prestone A.C., New York City, New York, U.S.	
36	Win	4–0 (32)	Charley Barry	NWS	10	Mar 25, 1911	National A.C., New York City, New York, U.S.	
35	Loss	4–0 (31)	Eddie Sherman	NWS	6	Mar 13, 1911	Olympic A.C., New York City, New York, U.S.	
34	Draw	4–0 (30)	Young Terry McGovern	NWS	6	Mar 11, 1911	National A.C., New York City, New York, U.S.	
33	Win	4–0 (29)	Young Abe Brown	KO	5 (6)	Mar 10, 1911	Prestone A.C., New York City, New York, U.S.	
32	Win	3–0 (29)	Frankie Fleming	NWS	6	Mar 1, 1911	Olympic A.C., New York City, New York, U.S.	
31	Win	3–0 (28)	Kid Black	NWS	6	Feb 24, 1911	Hudson Guild A.C., New York City, New York, U.S.	
30	Win	3–0 (27)	Joe Shear	NWS	4	Feb 23, 1911	National S.C., New York City, New York, U.S.	
29	Win	3–0 (26)	Young Ferris	NWS	4	Feb 17, 1911	National S.C., New York City, New York, U.S.	
28	Win	3–0 (25)	Packy Hommey	NWS	6	Feb 16, 1911	Long Acre A.A., New York City, New York, U.S.	
27	Draw	3–0 (24)	Willie Smith	NWS	4	Feb 11, 1911	National A.C., New York City, New York, U.S.	
26	Win	3–0 (23)	Young Ketchel	KO	1 (4)	Feb 11, 1911	National A.C., New York City, New York, U.S.	
25	Draw	2–0 (23)	Johnny Lore	NWS	4	Feb 7, 1911	Fairmont A.C., New York City, New York, U.S.	
24	Draw	2–0 (22)	Johnny Eggers	NWS	4	Feb 3, 1911	Empire A.C., Manhattan Casino, New York City, New York, U.S.	
23	Draw	2–0 (21)	Kid Goodman	NWS	4	Feb 2, 1911	New Amsterdam Opera House, National S.C., New York City, New York, U.S.	
22	Draw	2–0 (20)	Johnny Martin	NWS	4	Jan 25, 1911	Empire A.C., New York City, New York, U.S.	
21	Loss	2–0 (19)	Marty Allen	NWS	4	Jan 13, 1911	New Amsterdam Opera House, New York City, New York, U.S.	
20	Draw	2–0 (18)	Al Murphy	NWS	4	Jan 10, 1911	Midwood A.C., New York City, New York, U.S.	
19	Loss	2–0 (17)	Johnny McLean	NWS	6	Jan 6, 1911	Hudson Guild A.C., New York City, New York, U.S.	
18	Win	2–0 (16)	Eddie Jones	KO	1 (4)	Jan 5, 1911	National S.C., Lyric Hall, New York City, New York, U.S.	
17	Win	1–0 (16)	Willie Smith	NWS	4	Dec 30, 1910	National S.C., Lyric Hall, New York City, New York, U.S.	
16	Win	1–0 (15)	Eddie Moran	NWS	6	Dec 15, 1910	Empire A.C., Manhattan Casino, New York City, New York, U.S.	
15	ND	1–0 (14)	Young Egan	ND	4	Nov 29, 1910	Fordon A.C., New York City, New York, U.S.	
14	Win	1–0 (13)	Frank Woods	KO	2 (4)	Nov 26, 1910	New York City, New York, U.S.	
13	ND	0–0 (13)	Johnny Warren	ND	4	Nov 20, 1910	New York City, New York, U.S.	
12	ND	0–0 (12)	Leo Johnson	ND	4	Nov 18, 1910	New York City, New York, U.S.	
11	ND	0–0 (11)	Mike Malia	ND	4	Nov 11, 1910	New York City, New York, U.S.	
10	Win	0–0 (10)	Pete Powers	NWS	4	Nov 1, 1910	New Amsterdam Opera House, New York City, New York, U.S.	
9	ND	0–0 (9)	Eddie Sherman	ND	4	Oct 10, 1910	New York City, New York, U.S.	
8	ND	0–0 (8)	Eddie Moran	ND	4	Sep 20, 1910	New York City, New York, U.S.	
7	ND	0–0 (7)	Young Smith	ND	4	Sep 9, 1910	New York City, New York, U.S.	
6	ND	0–0 (6)	Jack Rose	ND	4	Sep 1, 1910	New York City, New York, U.S.	
5	ND	0–0 (5)	Charley Burns	ND	4	Aug 20, 1910	New York City, New York, U.S.	
4	ND	0–0 (4)	Skinny Bob	ND	4	Aug 17, 1910	New York City, New York, U.S.	
3	ND	0–0 (3)	Young Ferris	ND	4	Aug 15, 1910	New York City, New York, U.S.	
2	ND	0–0 (2)	Harry Smith	ND	4	Aug 12, 1910	New York City, New York, U.S.	
1	Win	0–0 (1)	Skinny Bob	NWS	4	Aug 10, 1910	Sharkey A.C., New York City, New York, U.S.	

=== Unofficial record ===
334 fights	201 wins	73 losses
By knockout	17	2
By decision	183	71
By disqualification	1	0
Draws	46	
No contests	14	

Record with the inclusion of newspaper decisions in the win/loss/draw column.

No.	Result	Record	Opponent	Type	Round(s)	Date	Location	Notes
334	Win	201–73–46 (14)	Mickey Greb	PTS	6	Dec 6, 1932	Orange, New Jersey, U.S.	
333	Loss	200–73–46 (14)	Al Dunbar	PTS	10	Aug 25, 1932	Fort Hamilton Arena, New York City, New York, U.S.	
332	Loss	200–72–46 (14)	George Goldberg	PTS	10	Nov 12, 1929	Broadway Arena, New York City, New York, U.S.	
331	Win	200–71–46 (14)	Al Goldberg	PTS	10	Oct 8, 1929	Uptown Lenox S.C., New York City, New York, U.S.	
330	Loss	199–71–46 (14)	Al Foreman	TKO	10 (10)	Sep 25, 1929	Forum, Montreal, Quebec, Canada	
329	Win	199–70–46 (14)	Eddie Martin	PTS	10	Jul 8, 1929	Dexter Park Arena, Woodhaven, New York City, New York, U.S.	
328	Loss	198–70–46 (14)	Eddie Wolfe	PTS	10	Apr 22, 1929	Heinemann Park, New Orleans, Louisiana, U.S.	
327	Loss	198–69–46 (14)	Joey Manuel	PTS	10	Apr 8, 1929	Convention Hall, Rochester, New York, U.S.	
326	Win	198–68–46 (14)	San Sanchez	KO	3 (10)	Mar 23, 1929	Olympia A.C., New York City, New York, U.S.	
325	Win	197–68–46 (14)	Lou Moscowitz	PTS	10	Feb 12, 1929	Uptown Lenox S.C., New York City, New York, U.S.	
324	Win	196–68–46 (14)	Antoine Ascencio	PTS	10	Feb 4, 1929	Arena, Philadelphia, Pennsylvania, U.S.	
323	Loss	195–68–46 (14)	Frankie Garcia	SD	10	Jan 22, 1929	South Main Street Armory, Wilkes-Barre, Pennsylvania, U.S.	
322	Loss	195–67–46 (14)	Charley Phil Rosenberg	PTS	10	Jan 4, 1929	Madison Square Garden, New York City, New York, U.S.	
321	Loss	195–66–46 (14)	Jackie Pilkington	PTS	10	Dec 3, 1928	Arena, New Haven, Connecticut, U.S.	
320	Draw	195–65–46 (14)	Billy Kowalik	PTS	6	Nov 23, 1928	Broadway Auditorium, Buffalo, New York City, New York, U.S.	
319	Win	195–65–45 (14)	Gaston Charles	PTS	10	Nov 12, 1928	Broadway Arena, New York City, New York, U.S.	
318	Loss	194–65–45 (14)	Tony Canzoneri	UD	15	Oct 24, 1927	Recreation Park, San Francisco, California, U.S.	For vacant NBA and The Ring featherweight titles
317	Loss	194–64–45 (14)	Tod Morgan	PTS	10	Oct 19, 1926	Recreation Park, San Francisco, California, U.S.	For NYSAC, NBA, and The Ring super-featherweight titles
316	Win	194–63–45 (14)	Fred Bretonnel	PTS	10	Aug 20, 1926	Ebbets Field, New York City, New York, U.S.	
315	Loss	193–63–45 (14)	Hilario Martínez	PTS	12	Mar 3, 1926	Arena Colon, Havana, Cuba	
314	Loss	193–62–45 (14)	Joe Glick	PTS	10	Jan 29, 1926	Madison Square Garden, New YorkCity, New York, U.S.	
313	Win	193–61–45 (14)	Allentown Johnny Leonard	PTS	10	Jul 20, 1925	Queensboro Stadium, Long Island City, New York City, New York, U.S.	
312	Loss	192–61–45 (14)	Sid Terris	PTS	15	Jun 12, 1925	Coney Island Stadium, New York City, New York, U.S.	
311	Loss	192–60–45 (14)	Sid Terris	PTS	12	May 5, 1925	Madison Square Garden, New York City, New York, U.S.	
310	Loss	192–59–45 (14)	Dick Finnegan	PTS	10	Apr 28, 1925	Auditorium, Washington, D.C., U.S.	
309	Loss	192–58–45 (14)	Red Chapman	PTS	10	Mar 23, 1925	Mechanics Building, Boston, Massachusetts, U.S.	
308	Loss	192–57–45 (14)	Charlie O'Connell	PTS	12	Oct 22, 1924	Public Hall, Cleveland, Ohio, U.S.	
307	Loss	192–56–45 (14)	Jack Bernstein	PTS	15	Sep 15, 1924	Queensboro Stadium, Long Island City, New York City, New York, U.S.	
306	Loss	192–55–45 (14)	Steve Sullivan	PTS	10	Jun 20, 1924	Henderson's Bowl, New York City, New York, U.S.	Lost NYSAC super-featherweight title; For inaugural The Ring super-featherweight title
305	Loss	192–54–45 (14)	Sammy Mandell	NWS	10	Jun 9, 1924	Open-air Arena, East Chicago, Indiana, U.S.	
304	Win	192–53–45 (14)	Luis Vicentini	PTS	12	Jun 2, 1924	Madison Square Garden, New York City, New York, U.S.	
303	Loss	191–53–45 (14)	Willie Ames	NWS	12	Apr 28, 1924	Broadway Auditorium, Buffalo, New York, U.S.	
302	Loss	191–52–45 (14)	Rocky Kansas	UD	10	Apr 21, 1924	Broadway Auditorium, Buffalo, New York, U.S.	
301	Win	191–51–45 (14)	Pal Moran	PTS	15	Feb 1, 1924	Madison Square Garden, New York City, New York, U.S.	
300	Win	190–51–45 (14)	Jack Bernstein	SD	15	Dec 17, 1923	Madison Square Garden, New York City, New York, U.S.	Won NYSAC super-featherweight title
299	Loss	189–51–45 (14)	Sid Barbarian	NWS	10	Dec 4, 1923	Arena Gardens, Detroit, Michigan, U.S.	
298	Loss	189–50–45 (14)	Al Shubert	PTS	10	Nov 29, 1923	Elm Rink, New Bedford, Massachusetts, U.S.	
297	Loss	189–49–45 (14)	Eddie Wagner	NWS	8	Aug 27, 1923	Shetzline Ballpark, Philadelphia, Pennsylvania, U.S.	
296	Win	189–48–45 (14)	Eugène Criqui	PTS	15	Jul 26, 1923	Polo Grounds, New York City, New York, U.S.	Won NYSAC featherweight title
295	Win	188–48–45 (14)	Richie Mitchell	NWS	10	Jun 12, 1923	Auditorium, Milwaukee, Wisconsin, U.S.	
294	Loss	187–48–45 (14)	Jack Bernstein	UD	15	May 30, 1923	Coney Island Velodrome, New York City, New York, U.S.	Lost NYSAC super-featherweight title
293	Win	187–47–45 (14)	Jimmy Brady	UD	12	May 18, 1923	Armouries, Windsor, Ontario, Canada	
292	Win	186–47–45 (14)	Gene Delmont	PTS	12	Apr 23, 1923	Coliseum, Toronto, Ontario, Canada	
291	Win	185–47–45 (14)	Tony Vaccarelli	PTS	4	Mar 28, 1923	Rink S.C., New York City, New York, U.S.	
290	Draw	184–47–45 (14)	Basil Galiano	PTS	10	Feb 20, 1923	Louisiana Auditorium, New Orleans, Louisiana, U.S.	
289	Loss	184–47–44 (14)	Tony Julian	PTS	10	Feb 6, 1923	Mechanics Building, Boston, Massachusetts, U.S.	
288	Win	184–46–44 (14)	Elino Flores	UD	15	Feb 2, 1923	Madison Square Garden, New York City, New York, U.S.	Retained NYSAC super-featherweight title
287	Win	183–46–44 (14)	Vincent Martin	PTS	10	Jan 19, 1923	Mechanics Building, Boston, Massachusetts, U.S.	
286	Win	182–46–44 (14)	Tommy O'Brien	NWS	10	Dec 29, 1922	Auditorium, Milwaukee, Wisconsin, U.S.	
285	Win	181–46–44 (14)	Gene Delmont	PTS	12	Dec 14, 1922	Clermont Avenue Rink, New York City, New York, U.S.	
284	Win	180–46–44 (14)	Willie Doyle	NWS	12	Dec 5, 1922	Broad A.C., Newark, New Jersey, U.S.	
283	Loss	179–46–44 (14)	Alex Hart	NWS	8	Nov 30, 1922	Arena, Philadelphia, Pennsylvania, U.S.	
282	Win	179–45–44 (14)	Phil Delmont	PTS	12	Nov 27, 1922	Broadway Arena, New York City, New York, U.S.	
281	Win	178–45–44 (14)	Vincent Martin	UD	15	Aug 28, 1922	Velodrome, New York City, New York, U.S.	Retained NYSAC super-featherweight title
280	Win	177–45–44 (14)	Danny Frush	KO	9 (15)	Aug 15, 1922	Ebbets Field, New York City, New York, U.S.	Won vacant NYSAC featherweight title
279	Win	176–45–44 (14)	Henry Koster	NWS	12	Jul 28, 1922	City Auditorium, Houston, Texas, U.S.	
278	Win	175–45–44 (14)	Shamus O'Brien	PTS	4	Jul 12, 1922	Queensboro Stadium, Long Island City, New York City, New York, U.S.	
277	Win	174–45–44 (14)	Jackie Sharkey	UD	15	Jul 6, 1922	Ebbets Field, New York City, New York, U.S.	Retained NYSAC super-featherweight title
276	Loss	173–45–44 (14)	Charley White	NWS	10	Jun 27, 1922	Rock Island, Illinois, U.S.	
275	Loss	173–44–44 (14)	Lew Tendler	UD	15	May 5, 1922	Madison Square Garden, New York City, New York, U.S.	
274	Loss	173–43–44 (14)	Johnny Shugrue	PTS	10	Apr 19, 1922	Worcester, Massachusetts, U.S.	
273	Win	173–42–44 (14)	Jimmy Goodrich	SD	10	Apr 4, 1922	Civic Arena, Toronto, Ontario, Canada	
272	Win	172–42–44 (14)	Charley White	PTS	15	Mar 17, 1922	Madison Square Garden, New York City, New York, U.S.	
271	NC	171–42–44 (14)	Jimmy Hanlon	NC	6 (10)	Feb 24, 1922	Town Hall, Scranton, Pennsylvania, U.S.	The referee halted this bout, claiming the men were not trying
270	Win	171–42–44 (13)	Johnny Darcy	PTS	10	Feb 17, 1922	Infantry Hall, Providence, Rhode Island, U.S.	
269	Win	170–42–44 (13)	Joe Benjamin	PTS	15	Feb 3, 1922	Madison Square Garden, New York City, New York, U.S.	
268	Win	169–42–44 (13)	Frankie Rice	PTS	12	Jan 26, 1922	4th Regiment Armory, Baltimore, Maryland, U.S.	
267	Loss	168–42–44 (13)	Charley White	SD	10	Jan 16, 1922	Mechanics Building, Boston, Massachusetts, U.S.	
266	Win	168–41–44 (13)	Whitey Fitzgerald	NWS	8	Jan 10, 1922	Ice Palace, Philadelphia, Pennsylvania, U.S.	
265	Draw	167–41–44 (13)	Willie Jackson	PTS	15	Dec 30, 1921	Madison Square Garden, New York City, New York, U.S.	
264	Win	167–41–43 (13)	Jimmy Hanlon	NWS	8	Dec 19, 1921	Olympia A.C., Philadelphia, Pennsylvania, U.S.	
263	Win	166–41–43 (13)	Harry Brown	NWS	8	Dec 12, 1921	Olympia A.C., Philadelphia, Pennsylvania, U.S.	
262	Win	165–41–43 (13)	Eddie Wallace	PTS	12	Nov 28, 1921	Broadway Arena, New York City, New York, U.S.	
261	Win	164–41–43 (13)	George Chaney	DQ	5 (15)	Nov 18, 1921	Madison Square Garden, New York City, New York, U.S.	Won inaugural NYSAC super-featherweight title
260	Win	163–41–43 (13)	Blockie Richards	PTS	12	Oct 3, 1921	Triangle Park, Dayton, Ohio, U.S.	
259	Win	162–41–43 (13)	Joe Tiplitz	PTS	10	Sep 19, 1921	Arena, Boston, Massachusetts, U.S.	
258	Win	161–41–43 (13)	Joe Tiplitz	NWS	8	Aug 24, 1921	Shibe Park, Philadelphia, Pennsylvania, U.S.	
257	Draw	160–41–43 (13)	Charley White	PTS	10	Aug 10, 1921	Boxing Drome, New York City, New York, U.S.	
256	Win	160–41–42 (13)	Eddie Wallace	PTS	12	Aug 1, 1921	Chadwick Park, Albany, New York, U.S.	
255	Win	159–41–42 (13)	Bert Spencer	TKO	9 (12)	Jul 29, 1921	Broadway Arena, New York City, New York, U.S.	
254	Win	158–41–42 (13)	George Chaney	NWS	8	Jul 18, 1921	Shibe Park, Philadelphia, Pennsylvania, U.S.	
253	Win	157–41–42 (13)	Jimmy Hanlon	PTS	12	Jun 15, 1921	Pioneer Sporting Club, New York City, New York, U.S.	
252	Win	156–41–42 (13)	George Chaney	PTS	10	Jun 10, 1921	Mechanics Building, Boston, Massachusetts, U.S.	
251	Draw	155–41–42 (13)	Sailor Friedman	NWS	10	May 27, 1921	Twin City A.C., East Chicago, Indiana, U.S.	
250	Loss	155–41–41 (13)	Johnny Ray	NWS	10	May 21, 1921	Forbes Field, Pittsburgh, Pennsylvania, U.S.	
249	Win	155–40–41 (13)	Rocky Kansas	NWS	10	Apr 26, 1921	Auditorium, Milwaukee, Wisconsin, U.S.	
248	Draw	154–40–41 (13)	Johnny Ray	NWS	10	Apr 11, 1921	Motor Square Garden, Pittsburgh, Pennsylvania, U.S.	
247	Loss	154–40–40 (13)	Willie Jackson	PTS	15	Feb 25, 1921	Madison Square Garden, New York City, New York, U.S.	
246	Draw	154–39–40 (13)	Pal Moran	PTS	15	Dec 20, 1920	Pilsbury Winter Gardens, New Orleans, Louisiana, U.S.	
245	Draw	154–39–39 (13)	Willie Jackson	MD	15	Nov 29, 1920	Manhattan Casino, New York City, New York, U.S.	
244	Loss	154–39–38 (13)	Joe Welling	PTS	15	Sep 17, 1920	Madison Square Garden, New York City, New York, U.S.	
243	Draw	154–38–38 (13)	Eddie Fitzsimmons	NWS	10	Jul 26, 1920	1st Regiment Armory, Newark, New Jersey, U.S.	
242	Win	154–38–37 (13)	Johnny Downes	PTS	12	Jul 13, 1920	Mechanics Building, Boston, Massachusetts, U.S.	
241	Draw	153–38–37 (13)	Young George Erne	PTS	12	Jun 25, 1920	2nd Regiment Armory, Trenton, New Jersey, U.S.	
240	Draw	153–38–36 (13)	Willie Jackson	PTS	12	Jun 14, 1920	Mechanics Building, Boston, Massachusetts, U.S.	
239	Win	153–38–35 (13)	Billy DeFoe	NWS	8	Jun 7, 1920	Shibe Park, Philadelphia, Pennsylvania, U.S.	
238	Win	152–38–35 (13)	Jack Lawler	PTS	12	May 29, 1920	Cuddy's Arena, Lawrence, Massachusetts, U.S.	
237	Draw	151–38–35 (13)	Mel Coogan	NWS	10	May 19, 1920	Navin Field, Detroit, Michigan, U.S.	
236	Loss	151–38–34 (13)	Willie Jackson	NWS	12	May 14, 1920	1st Regiment Armory, Newark, New Jersey, U.S.	
235	Loss	151–37–34 (13)	Joe Welling	NWS	12	Apr 23, 1920	Neil Park, Columbus, Ohio, U.S.	
234	Loss	151–36–34 (13)	Willie Jackson	NWS	8	Mar 8, 1920	4th Regiment Armory, Jersey City, New Jersey, U.S.	
233	Draw	151–35–34 (13)	Jack Lawler	PTS	10	Feb 20, 1920	Auditorium, Atlanta, Georgia, U.S.	
232	Loss	151–35–33 (13)	Benny Leonard	NWS	8	Feb 9, 1920	4th Regiment Armory, Jersey City, New Jersey, U.S.	
231	Win	151–34–33 (13)	Pal Moran	NWS	6	Dec 15, 1919	Olympia A.C., Philadelphia, Pennsylvania, U.S.	
230	Win	150–34–33 (13)	Charley White	NWS	10	Nov 26, 1919	Auditorium, Milwaukee, Wisconsin, U.S.	
229	Loss	149–34–33 (13)	Mel Coogan	NWS	8	Nov 10, 1919	4th Regiment Armory, Jersey City, New Jersey, U.S.	
228	Win	149–33–33 (13)	Tommy Touhey	TKO	5 (8)	Nov 4, 1919	1st Regiment Armory, Newark, New Jersey, U.S.	
227	Win	148–33–33 (13)	Willie Jackson	NWS	10	Oct 31, 1919	Auditorium, Milwaukee, Wisconsin, U.S.	
226	Win	147–33–33 (13)	Young Kloby	PTS	12	Oct 13, 1919	West Street Rink, Lawrence, Massachusetts, U.S.	
225	Win	146–33–33 (13)	Eddie Moy	NWS	6	Sep 27, 1919	National A.C., Philadelphia, Pennsylvania, U.S.	
224	Win	145–33–33 (13)	Charlie Parker	PTS	12	Sep 23, 1919	Mechanics Building, Boston, Massachusetts, U.S.	
223	Loss	144–33–33 (13)	Benny Leonard	NWS	8	Sep 17, 1919	1st Regiment Armory, Newark, New Jersey, U.S.	
222	Win	144–32–33 (13)	Frankie Britt	PTS	12	Sep 10, 1919	Marieville Gardens, North Providence, Rhode Island, U.S.	
221	Loss	143–32–33 (13)	Willie Jackson	NWS	8	Sep 1, 1919	4th Regiment Armory, Jersey City, New Jersey, U.S.	
220	Win	143–31–33 (13)	Joe Welling	NWS	6	Aug 11, 1919	Shibe Park, Philadelphia, Pennsylvania, U.S.	
219	Loss	142–31–33 (13)	Mel Coogan	NWS	8	Aug 4, 1919	Open-Air Arena, Jersey City, New Jersey, U.S.	
218	Win	142–30–33 (13)	Joe Tiplitz	PTS	12	Jul 21, 1919	Park Riding Academy, Boston, Massachusetts, U.S.	
217	Win	141–30–33 (13)	Benny Valger	PTS	12	Jul 15, 1919	Mechanics Building, Boston, Massachusetts, U.S.	
216	Loss	140–30–33 (13)	Ralph Brady	NWS	10	Jun 30, 1919	Arena, Syracuse, New York, U.S.	
215	Loss	140–29–33 (13)	Benny Leonard	NWS	6	Jun 16, 1919	Shibe Park, Philadelphia, Pennsylvania, U.S.	
214	Win	140–28–33 (13)	Joe Tiplitz	NWS	6	Jun 4, 1919	Shibe Park, Philadelphia, Pennsylvania, U.S.	
213	Win	139–28–33 (13)	Frankie Britt	NWS	12	May 30, 1919	Exposition Building, Portland, Maine, U.S.	
212	Win	138–28–33 (13)	Billy Whelan	NWS	10	May 15, 1919	Auditorium, Saint Paul, Minnesota, U.S.	
211	Draw	137–28–33 (13)	Richie Mitchell	NWS	10	May 9, 1919	Auditorium, Milwaukee, Wisconsin, U.S.	
210	Win	137–28–32 (13)	Johnny Mealey	NWS	6	Mar 3, 1919	Olympia A.C., Philadelphia, Pennsylvania, U.S.	
209	Win	136–28–32 (13)	Johnny Ray	NWS	10	Feb 24, 1919	Duquesne Garden, Pittsburgh, Pennsylvania, U.S.	
208	Loss	135–28–32 (13)	Benny Leonard	NWS	8	Jan 20, 1919	1st Regiment Armory, Newark, New Jersey, U.S.	
207	Loss	135–27–32 (13)	Johnny Mealey	NWS	6	Dec 7, 1918	National A.C., Philadelphia, Pennsylvania, U.S.	
206	Loss	135–26–32 (13)	Joe Welling	PTS	12	Dec 3, 1918	Arena, Boston, Massachusetts, U.S.	
205	Win	135–25–32 (13)	Joe Phillips	NWS	6	Nov 28, 1918	National A.C., Philadelphia, Pennsylvania, U.S.	
204	Draw	134–25–32 (13)	Joe Welling	NWS	6	Nov 16, 1918	Madison Square Garden, New York City, New York, U.S.	
203	Win	134–25–31 (13)	Lou Bogash	NWS	6	Nov 13, 1918	State Armory, Bridgeport, Connecticut, U.S.	
202	Win	133–25–31 (13)	Gussie Lewis	NWS	6	Nov 6, 1918	Olympia A.C., Philadelphia, Pennsylvania, U.S.	
201	Win	132–25–31 (13)	Frankie Callahan	PTS	12	Oct 29, 1918	Arena, Boston, Massachusetts, U.S.	
200	Win	131–25–31 (13)	Frankie Britt	PTS	12	Sep 24, 1918	Arena, Boston, Massachusetts, U.S.	
199	Draw	130–25–31 (13)	Rocky Kansas	PTS	12	Sep 10, 1918	Arena, Boston, Massachusetts, U.S.	
198	Win	130–25–30 (13)	Tommy Touhey	NWS	8	Aug 19, 1918	Armory A.A., Jersey City, New Jersey, U.S.	
197	Draw	129–25–30 (13)	Frankie Britt	PTS	12	Aug 6, 1918	Arena, Boston, Massachusetts, U.S.	
196	Win	129–25–29 (13)	Mickey Donley	NWS	8	Jun 24, 1918	Open-Air Arena, Jersey City, New Jersey, U.S.	
195	Draw	128–25–29 (13)	Frankie Britt	PTS	12	Jun 18, 1918	Arena, Boston, Massachusetts, U.S.	
194	Win	128–25–28 (13)	Billy DeFoe	PTS	12	Jun 3, 1918	Arena, New Haven, Connecticut, U.S.	
193	Win	127–25–28 (13)	Eddie Morgan	NWS	6	May 27, 1918	Olympia A.C., Philadelphia, Pennsylvania, U.S.	
192	Draw	126–25–28 (13)	Willie Jackson	PTS	12	Mar 25, 1918	Arena, New Haven, Connecticut, U.S.	
191	Win	126–25–27 (13)	Harry Carlson	PTS	12	Mar 12, 1918	Arena, Boston, Massachusetts, U.S.	
190	Win	125–25–27 (13)	George Chaney	NWS	6	Mar 9, 1918	National A.C., Philadelphia, Pennsylvania, U.S.	
189	Draw	124–25–27 (13)	Patsy Cline	PTS	20	Feb 11, 1918	Louisiana Auditorium, New Orleans, Louisiana, U.S.	
188	Win	124–25–26 (13)	Pal Moran	PTS	20	Jan 14, 1918	Dauphine Theater, New Orleans, Louisiana, U.S.	
187	Win	123–25–26 (13)	Battling Kunz	TKO	5 (12)	Dec 10, 1917	Casino Hall, Bridgeport, Connecticut, U.S.	
186	Draw	122–25–26 (13)	Johnny Ray	NWS	6	Dec 8, 1917	National A.C., Philadelphia, Pennsylvania, U.S.	
185	Win	122–25–25 (13)	Eddie Shannon	TKO	7 (12)	Nov 29, 1917	Unity Cycle Club, Lawrence, Massachusetts, U.S.	
184	Win	121–25–25 (13)	Frankie Britt	PTS	12	Nov 20, 1917	Arena, Boston, Massachusetts, U.S.	
183	Win	120–25–25 (13)	George Chaney	NWS	6	Nov 19, 1917	Olympia A.C., Philadelphia, Pennsylvania, U.S.	
182	Win	119–25–25 (13)	Philadelphia Pal Moore	NWS	10	Nov 6, 1917	Pioneer Sporting Club, New York City, New York, U.S.	
181	Win	118–25–25 (13)	Westside Jimmy Duffy	NWS	10	Oct 30, 1917	Pioneer S.C., New York City, New York, U.S.	
180	Loss	117–25–25 (13)	Patsy Cline	NWS	10	Oct 9, 1917	Manhattan Casino, New York City, New York, U.S.	
179	Loss	117–24–25 (13)	Lew Tendler	NWS	6	Oct 1, 1917	Olympia A.C., Philadelphia, Pennsylvania, U.S.	
178	Win	117–23–25 (13)	Joe Mooney	NWS	10	Sep 20, 1917	St. Nicholas Arena, New York City, New York, U.S.	
177	Win	116–23–25 (13)	Pete Hartley	PTS	12	Sep 18, 1917	Arena, Boston, Massachusetts, U.S.	
176	Win	115–23–25 (13)	Johnny Russell	NWS	6	Sep 12, 1917	Fairmont A.C., New York City, New York, U.S.	
175	Win	114–23–25 (13)	Johnny Mealey	NWS	6	Aug 22, 1917	Shibe Park, Philadelphia, Pennsylvania, U.S.	
174	Win	113–23–25 (13)	Tommy Touhey	NWS	10	Jul 24, 1917	Pioneer S.C., New York City, New York, U.S.	
173	Loss	112–23–25 (13)	Joe Welling	NWS	10	Jul 20, 1917	St. Nicholas Arena, New York City, New York, U.S.	
172	Draw	112–22–25 (13)	George Chaney	NWS	6	Jul 12, 1917	Shibe Park, Philadelphia, Pennsylvania, U.S.	
171	Win	112–22–24 (13)	Willie Jackson	NWS	10	Jun 29, 1917	St. Nicholas Arena, New York City, New York, U.S.	
170	Win	111–22–24 (13)	Frankie Callahan	PTS	12	Jun 12, 1917	Arena, Boston, Massachusetts, U.S.	
169	Win	110–22–24 (13)	Joe Welling	NWS	10	Jun 7, 1917	St. Nicholas Arena, New York City, New York, U.S.	
168	Win	109–22–24 (13)	Rocky Kansas	PTS	12	May 29, 1917	Arena, Boston, Massachusetts, U.S.	
167	Win	108–22–24 (13)	Chick Simler	PTS	12	May 15, 1917	Arena, Boston, Massachusetts, U.S.	
166	Win	107–22–24 (13)	Chick Simler	PTS	12	May 1, 1917	Grand Opera House, Boston, Massachusetts, U.S.	
165	Win	106–22–24 (13)	Tommy Touhey	NWS	10	Apr 24, 1917	Broadway S.C., New York City, New York, U.S.	
164	Win	105–22–24 (13)	Johnny Mealey	NWS	6	Apr 16, 1917	Olympia A.C., Philadelphia, Pennsylvania, U.S.	
163	Win	104–22–24 (13)	Jimmy Powers	KO	9 (10)	Apr 10, 1917	Pioneer S.C., New York City, New York, U.S.	
162	Loss	103–22–24 (13)	Lew Tendler	NWS	6	Mar 26, 1917	Olympia A.C., Philadelphia, Pennsylvania, U.S.	
161	Win	103–21–24 (13)	Westside Jimmy Duffy	NWS	10	Mar 6, 1917	Pioneer S.C., New York City, New York, U.S.	
160	Win	102–21–24 (13)	Young Terry McGovern	NWS	6	Mar 5, 1917	Olympia A.C., Philadelphia, Pennsylvania, U.S.	
159	Loss	101–21–24 (13)	Frankie Callahan	NWS	10	Feb 20, 1917	Broadway S.C., New York City, New York, U.S.	
158	Win	101–20–24 (13)	Jimmy Hanlon	PTS	20	Jan 29, 1917	Tulane Arena, New Orleans, Louisiana, U.S.	
157	Loss	100–20–24 (13)	Willie Jackson	KO	1 (6)	Jan 15, 1917	Olympia A.C., Philadelphia, Pennsylvania, U.S.	
156	Win	100–19–24 (13)	Buck Fleming	NWS	6	Dec 18, 1916	Olympia A.C., Philadelphia, Pennsylvania, U.S.	
155	Draw	99–19–24 (13)	Johnny Tillman	NWS	6	Dec 4, 1916	Olympia A.C., Philadelphia, Pennsylvania, U.S.	
154	Win	99–19–23 (13)	Eddie Wallace	NWS	10	Nov 30, 1916	Broadway Arena, New York City, New York, U.S.	
153	Win	98–19–23 (13)	Benny Leonard	NWS	6	Nov 15, 1916	Olympia A.C., Philadelphia, Pennsylvania, U.S.	
152	Win	97–19–23 (13)	Jimmy Hanlon	NWS	12	Oct 17, 1916	Future City A.C., Saint Louis, Missouri, U.S.	
151	Win	96–19–23 (13)	Ever Hammer	PTS	15	Sep 11, 1916	Convention Hall, Kansas City, Missouri, U.S.	
150	Win	95–19–23 (13)	Joe Welling	NWS	10	Aug 30, 1916	Madison Square Garden, New York City, New York, U.S.	
149	Win	94–19–23 (13)	Johnny O'Leary	KO	9 (12)	Aug 15, 1916	Armory, Boston, Massachusetts, U.S.	
148	Win	93–19–23 (13)	Ever Hammer	NWS	10	Jul 4, 1916	Lovington Field, East Chicago, Indiana, U.S.	
147	Draw	92–19–23 (13)	Benny Leonard	NWS	10	Jun 12, 1916	Madison Square Garden, New York City, New York, U.S.	
146	Win	92–19–22 (13)	Eddie Wallace	NWS	12	May 30, 1916	Marieville Gardens, North Providence, Rhode Island, U.S.	
145	Win	91–19–22 (13)	Buck Fleming	NWS	6	May 22, 1916	Olympia A.C., Philadelphia, Pennsylvania, U.S.	
144	Win	90–19–22 (13)	Johnny O'Leary	NWS	10	May 17, 1916	Broadway Auditorium, Buffalo, New York, U.S.	
143	Win	89–19–22 (13)	Matt Wells	PTS	12	May 16, 1916	Arena, Boston, Massachusetts, U.S.	
142	Win	88–19–22 (13)	Phil Bloom	NWS	10	Apr 11, 1916	Broadway Arena, New York City, New York, U.S.	
141	Draw	87–19–22 (13)	Benny Leonard	NWS	10	Mar 8, 1916	Madison Square Garden, New York City, New York, U.S.	
140	Loss	87–19–21 (13)	Joe Mandot	PTS	20	Feb 21, 1916	Louisiana Auditorium, New Orleans, Louisiana, U.S.	
139	Win	87–18–21 (13)	Jimmy Murphy	NWS	6	Feb 7, 1916	Olympia A.C., Philadelphia, Pennsylvania, U.S.	
138	Win	86–18–21 (13)	Stanley Yoakum	PTS	20	Jan 22, 1916	Stockyards Stadium, Denver, Colorado, U.S.	
137	Win	85–18–21 (13)	Jimmy Murphy	NWS	6	Jan 10, 1916	Olympia A.C., Philadelphia, Pennsylvania, U.S.	
136	Win	84–18–21 (13)	Joe Azevedo	NWS	6	Jan 1, 1916	National A.C., Philadelphia, Pennsylvania, U.S.	
135	Win	83–18–21 (13)	Matt Wells	PTS	12	Dec 10, 1915	Italian Riverside Club, New Haven, Connecticut, U.S.	
134	Win	82–18–21 (13)	Phil Bloom	NWS	10	Dec 2, 1915	Pioneer Sporting Club, New York City, New York, U.S.	
133	Win	81–18–21 (13)	Phil Bloom	NWS	10	Nov 22, 1915	Clermont Avenue Rink, New York City, New York, U.S.	
132	Win	80–18–21 (13)	Mexican Joe Rivers	NWS	10	Nov 8, 1915	Auditorium, Milwaukee, Wisconsin, U.S.	
131	Win	79–18–21 (13)	Willie Ritchie	NWS	10	Oct 26, 1915	Madison Square Garden, New York City, New York, U.S.	
130	Draw	78–18–21 (13)	Joe Mandot	NWS	10	Sep 23, 1915	Ebbets Field, New York City, New York, U.S.	
129	Win	78–18–20 (13)	Richie Mitchell	NWS	10	Aug 30, 1915	Auditorium, Milwaukee, Wisconsin, U.S.	
128	Win	77–18–20 (13)	Mexican Joe Rivers	NWS	10	Jul 23, 1915	Ebbets Field, New York City, New York, U.S.	
127	Win	76–18–20 (13)	Leach Cross	NWS	10	Jun 18, 1915	Ebbets Field, New York City, New York, U.S.	
126	Win	75–18–20 (13)	Johnny Drummie	KO	2 (10)	May 31, 1915	Ebbets Field, New York City, New York, U.S.	
125	Win	74–18–20 (13)	Frankie Callahan	NWS	10	May 10, 1915	Joe Levy's Open Air Club, Cincinnati, Ohio, U.S.	
124	Win	73–18–20 (13)	Rocky Kansas	NWS	10	May 3, 1915	Broadway Auditorium, Buffalo, New York, U.S.	
123	Win	72–18–20 (13)	Frankie Callahan	NWS	10	Mar 30, 1915	Broadway Arena, New York City, New York, U.S.	
122	Win	71–18–20 (13)	Joe Azevedo	PTS	8	Mar 22, 1915	Phoenix A.C., Memphis, Tennessee, U.S.	
121	Win	70–18–20 (13)	Frankie Callahan	NWS	10	Mar 16, 1915	Broadway S.C., New York City, New York, U.S.	
120	Win	69–18–20 (13)	Benny Leonard	NWS	10	Mar 2, 1915	135th Street A.C., New York City, New York, U.S.	
119	Draw	68–18–20 (13)	Joe Mandot	PTS	20	Feb 14, 1915	McDonoughville Arena, New Orleans, Louisiana, U.S.	
118	Loss	68–18–19 (13)	Lockport Jimmy Duffy	NWS	10	Jan 15, 1915	Hippodrome, Milwaukee, Wisconsin, U.S.	
117	Win	68–17–19 (13)	Mexican Joe Rivers	PTS	20	Dec 8, 1914	Arena, Vernon, California, U.S.	
116	Draw	67–17–19 (13)	Willie Ritchie	PTS	4	Oct 23, 1914	Coffroth's Arena, Daly City, California, U.S.	
115	Win	67–17–18 (13)	Joe Azevedo	PTS	10	Oct 20, 1914	Piedmont Pavilion, Oakland, California, U.S.	
114	Draw	66–17–18 (13)	Willie Beecher	PTS	20	Sep 28, 1914	Arena, Vernon, California, U.S.	
113	Win	66–17–17 (13)	Grover Hayes	PTS	20	Jul 26, 1914	Arena, Ciudad Juarez, Chihuahua, Mexico	
112	Loss	65–17–17 (13)	Joe Mandot	NWS	10	Jul 4, 1914	Pelican Stadium, New Orleans, Louisiana, U.S.	
111	Win	65–16–17 (13)	Johnny Gallant	TKO	8 (12)	Jun 16, 1914	Arena, Boston, Massachusetts, U.S.	
110	Win	64–16–17 (13)	Willie Jones	NWS	10	May 16, 1914	Irving A.C., New York City, New York, U.S.	
109	Win	63–16–17 (13)	George Chaney	NWS	6	Apr 20, 1914	Olympia A.C., Philadelphia, Pennsylvania, U.S.	
108	Draw	62–16–17 (13)	Matty Baldwin	PTS	12	Apr 14, 1914	Arena, Boston, Massachusetts, U.S.	
107	Win	62–16–16 (13)	Charley Thomas	NWS	6	Apr 11, 1914	National A.C., Philadelphia, Pennsylvania, U.S.	
106	Win	61–16–16 (13)	Johnny Lustig	NWS	10	Mar 28, 1914	Irving A.C., New York City, New York, U.S.	
105	Win	60–16–16 (13)	Patsy Drouillard	PTS	8	Mar 25, 1914	Windsor, Ontario, Canada	
104	Draw	59–16–16 (13)	Eddie Wallace	NWS	10	Mar 21, 1914	Irving A.C., New York City, New York, U.S.	
103	Win	59–16–15 (13)	Special Delivery Hirsch	NWS	10	Mar 17, 1914	Atlantic Garden A.C., New York City, New York, U.S.	
102	Win	58–16–15 (13)	Eddie Moy	NWS	6	Feb 28, 1914	National A.C., Philadelphia, Pennsylvania, U.S.	
101	Win	57–16–15 (13)	Philadelphia Pal Moore	NWS	10	Feb 26, 1914	National S.C., New York City, New York, U.S.	
100	Loss	56–16–15 (13)	Rocky Kansas	NWS	10	Feb 24, 1914	Broadway Auditorium, Buffalo, New York, U.S.	
99	Win	56–15–15 (13)	Joe Shugrue	PTS	12	Feb 19, 1914	Auditorium, Waterbury, Connecticut, U.S.	
98	Win	55–15–15 (13)	Johnny Lore	NWS	10	Feb 6, 1914	Empire A.C., New Star Casino, New York City, New York, U.S.	
97	Win	54–15–15 (13)	Sapper Jack O'Neill	NWS	10	Jan 27, 1914	Madison Square Garden, New York City, New York, U.S.	
96	Win	53–15–15 (13)	Joe Shugrue	NWS	10	Jan 23, 1914	Empire A.C., New Star Casino, New York City, New York, U.S.	
95	Win	52–15–15 (13)	Johnny Reiss	NWS	3	Jan 10, 1914	Crescent A.C., New York City, New York, U.S.	
94	Loss	51–15–15 (13)	Freddie Welsh	NWS	10	Jan 1, 1914	Pelican Stadium, New Orleans, Louisiana, U.S.	
93	Draw	51–14–15 (13)	Johnny Griffiths	NWS	12	Dec 15, 1913	Civic Auditorium, Canton, Ohio, U.S.	
92	Win	51–14–14 (13)	Charley White	NWS	10	Nov 27, 1913	Pelican Stadium, New Orleans, Louisiana, U.S.	
91	Win	50–14–14 (13)	Joe Azevedo	PTS	20	Oct 14, 1913	Arena, Vernon, California, U.S.	
90	Win	49–14–14 (13)	Jack White	TKO	9 (20)	Aug 12, 1913	Arena, Vernon, California, U.S.	
89	Win	48–14–14 (13)	Tommy Dixon	PTS	10	Jul 4, 1913	Albuquerque, New Mexico, U.S.	
88	Win	47–14–14 (13)	Jack White	PTS	20	Jun 17, 1913	Arena, Vernon, California, U.S.	
87	Draw	46–14–14 (13)	Johnny Kilbane	PTS	20	Apr 29, 1913	Arena, Vernon, California, U.S.	For world featherweight title
86	Win	46–14–13 (13)	Special Delivery Hirsch	NWS	10	Jan 27, 1913	Olympia Boxing Club, New York City, New York, U.S.	
85	Win	45–14–13 (13)	Tommy Shea	NWS	12	Jan 23, 1913	Auditorium, Waterbury, Connecticut, U.S.	
84	Win	44–14–13 (13)	Willie Jones	NWS	10	Jan 22, 1913	Clermont Avenue Rink, New York City, New York, U.S.	
83	Win	43–14–13 (13)	Willie Jones	NWS	10	Jan 11, 1913	Clermont Avenue Rink, New York City, New York, U.S.	
82	Win	42–14–13 (13)	Eddie Morgan	NWS	10	Dec 19, 1912	44th Street A.C., New York City, New York, U.S.	
81	Win	41–14–13 (13)	Frankie Conley	TKO	19 (20)	Nov 19, 1912	Arena, Vernon, California, U.S.	
80	Win	40–14–13 (13)	Matt Brock	PTS	10	Oct 21, 1912	Orleans A.C., New Orleans, Louisiana, U.S.	
79	Loss	39–14–13 (13)	Philadelphia Pal Moore	NWS	10	Oct 11, 1912	St. Nicholas Arena, New York City, New York, U.S.	
78	Win	39–13–13 (13)	Harry Thomas	NWS	10	Sep 30, 1912	Madison Square Garden, New York City, New York, U.S.	
77	Win	38–13–13 (13)	George Kirkwood	NWS	10	Sep 25, 1912	St. Nicholas Arena, New York City, New York, U.S.	
76	Loss	37–13–13 (13)	Johnny Kilbane	NWS	10	Sep 4, 1912	St. Nicholas Arena, New York City, New York, U.S.	
75	Draw	37–12–13 (13)	Matt Brock	PTS	12	Aug 13, 1912	Luna Park Arena, Cleveland, Ohio, U.S.	
74	Win	37–12–12 (13)	Patsy Kline	NWS	10	Aug 7, 1912	St. Nicholas Arena, New York City, New York, U.S.	
73	Win	36–12–12 (13)	Ty Cobb	TKO	1 (10)	Jul 24, 1912	St. Nicholas Arena, New York City, New York, U.S.	
72	Draw	35–12–12 (13)	Joe Shugrue	NWS	10	Jul 1, 1912	Madison Square Garden, New York City, New York, U.S.	
71	Win	35–12–11 (13)	Young Wagner	NWS	10	Jun 18, 1912	St. Nicholas Arena, New York City, New York, U.S.	
70	Win	34–12–11 (13)	Packy Hommey	NWS	10	May 21, 1912	St. Nicholas Arena, New York City, New York, U.S.	
69	Loss	33–12–11 (13)	Charley White	NWS	10	Apr 30, 1912	Alhambra, Syracuse, New York, U.S.	
68	Win	33–11–11 (13)	Tommy Houck	NWS	10	Apr 10, 1912	Manhattan Casino, New York City, New York, U.S.	
67	Win	32–11–11 (13)	Young Wagner	NWS	10	Mar 27, 1912	Manhattan Casino, New York City, New York, U.S.	
66	Loss	31–11–11 (13)	Kid Julian	NWS	10	Mar 20, 1912	Alhambra, Syracuse, New York, U.S.	
65	Win	31–10–11 (13)	Young Abe Brown	NWS	10	Mar 16, 1912	Clermont Avenue Rink, New York City, New York, U.S.	
64	Draw	30–10–11 (13)	Tommy Houck	NWS	6	Mar 8, 1912	Nonpareil A.C., Philadelphia, Pennsylvania, U.S.	
63	Loss	30–10–10 (13)	Eddie O'Keefe	NWS	10	Mar 4, 1912	Manhattan Casino, New York City, New York, U.S.	
62	Win	30–9–10 (13)	Eddie O'Keefe	NWS	10	Feb 8, 1912	National S.C., New York City, New York, U.S.	
61	Win	29–9–10 (13)	Paddy Callahan	NWS	10	Jan 24, 1912	Long Acre A.A., New York City, New York, U.S.	
60	Draw	28–9–10 (13)	Ty Cobb	NWS	10	Jan 4, 1912	Fordon A.C., New York City, New York, U.S.	
59	Loss	28–9–9 (13)	Young Johnny Cohen	NWS	10	Dec 18, 1911	Fordon A.C., New York City, New York, U.S.	
58	Win	28–8–9 (13)	Young O'Leary	NWS	10	Dec 11, 1911	Fordon A.C., New York City, New York, U.S.	
57	Loss	27–8–9 (13)	Bobby Reynolds	NWS	6	Dec 2, 1911	National A.C., Philadelphia, Pennsylvania, U.S.	
56	Draw	27–7–9 (13)	Tommy O'Toole	NWS	6	Nov 30, 1911	National A.C., Philadelphia, Pennsylvania, U.S.	
55	Win	27–7–8 (13)	Young Abe Brown	NWS	10	Nov 22, 1911	Houston A.C., New York City, New York, U.S.	
54	Win	26–7–8 (13)	Tommy Houck	NWS	10	Nov 4, 1911	Olympic A.C., New York City, New York, U.S.	
53	Loss	25–7–8 (13)	Charley Thomas	NWS	6	Oct 28, 1911	National A.C., Philadelphia, Pennsylvania, U.S.	
52	Win	25–6–8 (13)	Harry Tracey	NWS	6	Oct 7, 1911	National A.C., Philadelphia, Pennsylvania, U.S.	
51	Win	24–6–8 (13)	Kid Ghetto	NWS	10	Sep 16, 1911	Fairmont A.C., New York City, New York, U.S.	
50	ND	23–6–8 (13)	Mike Malia	ND	10	Sep 9, 1911	Port Jervis, New York, U.S.	
49	Win	23–6–8 (12)	Ty Cobb	NWS	10	Aug 12, 1911	Fairmont A.C., New York City, New York, U.S.	
48	Win	22–6–8 (12)	Kid Black	NWS	10	Aug 5, 1911	Fairmont A.C., New York City, New York, U.S.	
47	Win	21–6–8 (12)	Joe Shugrue	NWS	10	Jul 29, 1911	Long Acre A.C., New York City, New York, U.S.	
46	Loss	20–6–8 (12)	Joe Shear	NWS	10	Jul 3, 1911	Olympic A.C., New York City, New York, U.S.	
45	Loss	20–5–8 (12)	Young Terry McGovern	NWS	6	Jun 13, 1911	Brown's Gym, New York City, New York, U.S.	
44	Win	20–4–8 (12)	Frankie Fleming	NWS	10	Jun 10, 1911	Fairmont A.C., New York City, New York, U.S.	
43	Win	19–4–8 (12)	Mike Mada	NWS	10	May 31, 1911	Port Jervis, New York, U.S.	
42	Draw	18–4–8 (12)	Joe Shugrue	NWS	6	May 15, 1911	Perth Amboy, New Jersey, U.S.	
41	Win	18–4–7 (12)	Mike Malia	NWS	6	May 5, 1911	National S.C., New York City, New York, U.S.	
40	Win	17–4–7 (12)	Kid Black	NWS	10	Apr 28, 1911	Prestone A.C., New York City, New York, U.S.	
39	Win	16–4–7 (12)	Babe Cullen	NWS	6	Apr 25, 1911	Brown's Gym, New York City, New York, U.S.	
38	Win	15–4–7 (12)	Joe Shear	NWS	6	Apr 17, 1911	Olympic A.C., New York City, New York, U.S.	
37	Loss	14–4–7 (12)	Kid Black	NWS	10	Mar 31, 1911	Prestone A.C., New York City, New York, U.S.	
36	Win	14–3–7 (12)	Charley Barry	NWS	10	Mar 25, 1911	National A.C., New York City, New York, U.S.	
35	Loss	13–3–7 (12)	Eddie Sherman	NWS	6	Mar 13, 1911	Olympic A.C., New York City, New York, U.S.	
34	Draw	13–2–7 (12)	Young Terry McGovern	NWS	6	Mar 11, 1911	National A.C., New York City, New York, U.S.	
33	Win	13–2–6 (12)	Young Abe Brown	KO	5 (6)	Mar 10, 1911	Prestone A.C., New York City, New York, U.S.	
32	Win	12–2–6 (12)	Frankie Fleming	NWS	6	Mar 1, 1911	Olympic A.C., New York City, New York, U.S.	
31	Win	11–2–6 (12)	Kid Black	NWS	6	Feb 24, 1911	Hudson Guild A.C., New York City, New York, U.S.	
30	Win	10–2–6 (12)	Joe Shear	NWS	4	Feb 23, 1911	National S.C., New York City, New York, U.S.	
29	Win	9–2–6 (12)	Young Ferris	NWS	4	Feb 17, 1911	National S.C., New York City, New York, U.S.	
28	Win	8–2–6 (12)	Packy Hommey	NWS	6	Feb 16, 1911	Long Acre A.A., New York City, New York, U.S.	
27	Draw	7–2–6 (12)	Willie Smith	NWS	4	Feb 11, 1911	National A.C., New York City, New York, U.S.	
26	Win	7–2–5 (12)	Young Ketchel	KO	1 (4)	Feb 11, 1911	National A.C., New York City, New York, U.S.	
25	Draw	6–2–5 (12)	Johnny Lore	NWS	4	Feb 7, 1911	Fairmont A.C., New York City, New York, U.S.	
24	Draw	6–2–4 (12)	Johnny Eggers	NWS	4	Feb 3, 1911	Empire A.C., Manhattan Casino, New York City, New York, U.S.	
23	Draw	6–2–3 (12)	Kid Goodman	NWS	4	Feb 2, 1911	New Amsterdam Opera House, National S.C., New York City, New York, U.S.	
22	Draw	6–2–2 (12)	Johnny Martin	NWS	4	Jan 25, 1911	Empire A.C., New York City, New York, U.S.	
21	Loss	6–2–1 (12)	Marty Allen	NWS	4	Jan 13, 1911	New Amsterdam Opera House, New York City, New York, U.S.	
20	Draw	6–1–1 (12)	Al Murphy	NWS	4	Jan 10, 1911	Midwood A.C., New York City, New York, U.S.	
19	Loss	6–1 (12)	Johnny McLean	NWS	6	Jan 6, 1911	Hudson Guild A.C., New York City, New York, U.S.	
18	Win	6–0 (12)	Eddie Jones	KO	1 (4)	Jan 5, 1911	National S.C., Lyric Hall, New York City, New York, U.S.	
17	Win	5–0 (12)	Willie Smith	NWS	4	Dec 30, 1910	National S.C., Lyric Hall, New York City, New York, U.S.	
16	Win	4–0 (12)	Eddie Moran	NWS	6	Dec 15, 1910	Empire A.C., Manhattan Casino, New York City, New York, U.S.	
15	ND	3–0 (12)	Young Egan	ND	4	Nov 29, 1910	Fordon A.C., New York City, New York, U.S.	
14	Win	3–0 (11)	Frank Woods	KO	2 (4)	Nov 26, 1910	New York City, New York, U.S.	
13	ND	2–0 (11)	Johnny Warren	ND	4	Nov 20, 1910	New York City, New York, U.S.	
12	ND	2–0 (10)	Leo Johnson	ND	4	Nov 18, 1910	New York City, New York, U.S.	
11	ND	2–0 (9)	Mike Malia	ND	4	Nov 11, 1910	New York City, New York, U.S.	
10	Win	2–0 (8)	Pete Powers	NWS	4	Nov 1, 1910	New Amsterdam Opera House, New York City, New York, U.S.	
9	ND	1–0 (8)	Eddie Sherman	ND	4	Oct 10, 1910	New York City, New York, U.S.	
8	ND	1–0 (7)	Eddie Moran	ND	4	Sep 20, 1910	New York City, New York, U.S.	
7	ND	1–0 (6)	Young Smith	ND	4	Sep 9, 1910	New York City, New York, U.S.	
6	ND	1–0 (5)	Jack Rose	ND	4	Sep 1, 1910	New York City, New York, U.S.	
5	ND	1–0 (4)	Charley Burns	ND	4	Aug 20, 1910	New York City, New York, U.S.	
4	ND	1–0 (3)	Skinny Bob	ND	4	Aug 17, 1910	New York City, New York, U.S.	
3	ND	1–0 (2)	Young Ferris	ND	4	Aug 15, 1910	New York City, New York, U.S.	
2	ND	1–0 (1)	Harry Smith	ND	4	Aug 12, 1910	New York City, New York, U.S.	
1	Win	1–0	Skinny Bob	NWS	4	Aug 10, 1910	Sharkey A.C., New York City, New York, U.S.	

== See also ==
- List of super featherweight boxing champions
- List of featherweight boxing champions

Achievements
Inaugural Champion	World Junior Lightweight Champion; November 18, 1921 – December 23, 1923	Succeeded by Jack Bernstein
Preceded by Eugène Criqui	World Featherweight Champion; July 26, 1923 – August 1923; Vacated	Vacant Title next held by Kid Kaplan
Preceded by Jack Bernstein	World Junior Lightweight Champion; December 17, 1923 – June 20, 1924	Succeeded by Steve Sullivan
