= Joseph Benjamin =

Joseph Benjamin may refer to:

- Joey Benjamin (1961–2021), English cricketer
- Joseph Benjamin (actor) (born 1976), Nigerian actor, model and television presenter
- Joe Benjamin (1919–1974), American jazz bassist
- Joe Benjamin (footballer) (born 1990), English footballer
- Joe Benjamin (boxer) (1908–1983), American boxer
