= Joe Benjamin (boxer) =

American boxer (1898–1983)

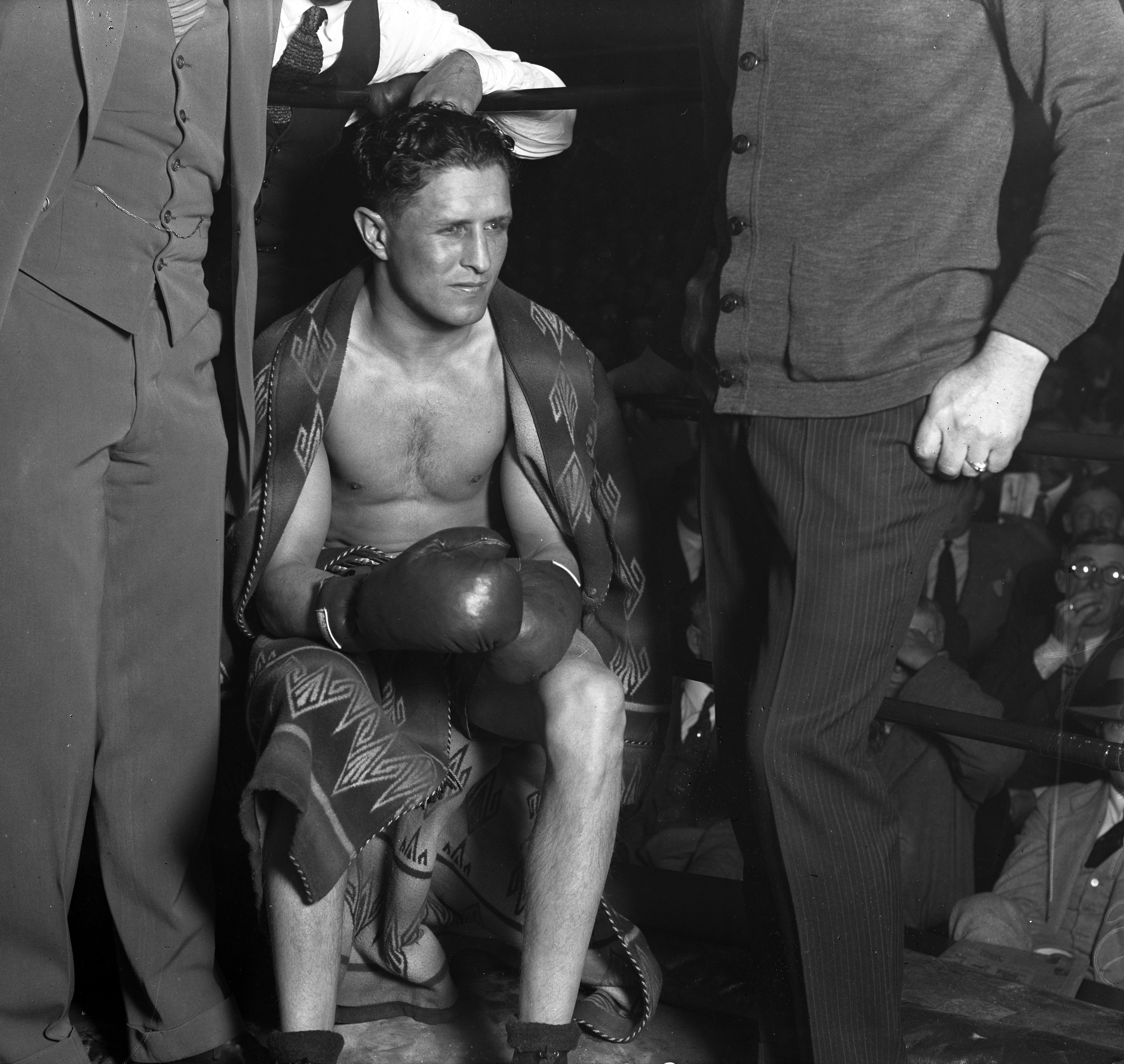
- Benjamin in 1923

Personal information
- Nickname: The San Joaquin Sheik
- Nationality: (United States) American
- Born: Joseph Benjamin; September 7, 1898 Portland, Oregon, U.S.
- Died: July 6, 1983 (aged 84) San Francisco, California, U.S.
- Weight: Lightweight

Boxing career
- Stance: Orthodox

Boxing record
- Total fights: 70
- Wins: 51
- Win by KO: 19
- Losses: 25
- Draws: 22
- No contests: 9

Joe Benjamin (September 7, 1898 – July 6, 1983) was an American boxer. He was a Pacific Coast Featherweight Boxing Champion in 1915 and a 1922 World Junior Lightweight Boxing Championship contender against Johnny Dundee. In his fifty-one reported wins on BoxRec, he had nineteen by knockout, giving him an impressive knockout ratio.

With exceptional defensive skills, he was one of only two boxers of his era to fight 200 bouts and receive only one knockout. In his career he sparred and trained with champion Jack Dempsey, and fought reigning champions Benny Leonard, and Johnny Dundee.

During his boxing career, he appeared in a few of his friend Douglas Fairbanks's movies around 1920, married and kept company with several actresses, and later raised prize race horses.

== Early life ==
Benjamin was born on September 7, 1898 (or, in 1899, according to the U.S. Federal Census of 1900) in Portland, Oregon to German-Jewish immigrants, Isaac and Goldie Benjamin. His father operated a clothing store in downtown Portland. When he was four his family moved to Spokane, Washington. Leaving home at a young age, Benjamin took an early job as a stable boy in Allentown, Idaho, and tried to make a living as a jockey, but seemed to have more talent as a boxer. By sixteen, he had returned to Spokane and joined an amateur boxing club where he won twenty-five amateur bouts and the Northwestern Pacific Coast Flyweight Title.

== Early boxing career ==
Turning professional in 1914, he took the Northwest Featherweight Title from Billy Mascott of Portland in ten rounds in January 1915. On March 7, 1916, he took the Pacific Coast Featherweight belt from Jimmy Fox in Portland in a decision bout. Spending too many late nights carousing as was often his custom, he lost the title to Lee Johnson of Oakland in Portland in six rounds on May 17 of that year. Fighting Muff Bronson, in July and August 1916, he lost his first match suffering from the mumps and nearly died from the effects of the illness and the punches he endured during the bout.

Moving to Los Angeles where he could more easily find work, he defeated Chet Neff, Young France, and Mexican Joe Rivers, acquiring Jack Doyle as a promoter, and the actor Douglas Fairbanks Jr. as a friend and boxing student. He would begin a brief two year movie career through his association with the actor.

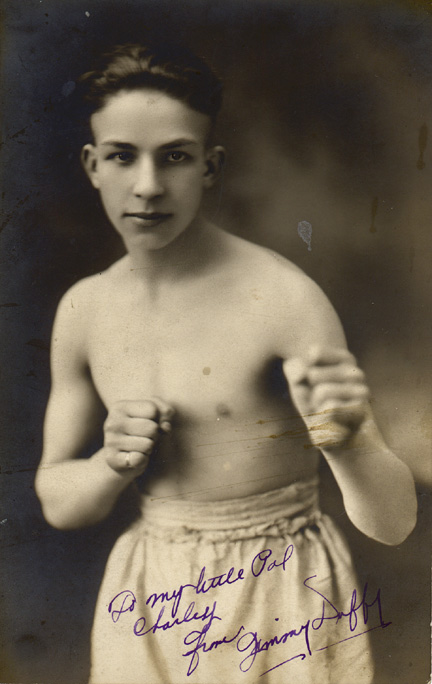
Jimmy Duffy

Returning to San Francisco at the start of World War I, he defeated Phil Salvadore and Frankie Farren but lost twice to talented boxer "Oakland" Jimmy Duffy in Oakland and San Francisco in November and December 1918. His four-round bout with Farren on May 28, 1920, at Dreamland Rink in San Francisco was ruled a draw, but was a thrilling affair with both boxers down during the bout but always up to continue the match.

== Mid boxing career ==
On January 31, 1919, he had an historic four-round match with the great lightweight champion Benny Leonard, in Civic Auditorium in San Francisco. Though not a title match, Leonard was so impressed with Benjamin he encouraged him to fight on the East coast. Fighting in Philadelphia, he defeated Al Thompson and Joe Koons in the late summer of 1919, and then beat Johnny Drummie and Jimmy Murphey in the fall.

On November 1, 1917, Benjamin cited evidence that he had taken the Pacific Coast Featherweight championship as a result of his win over Jimmy Fox in Portland, and this claim was not disputed.

As early as November 4, 1919, the Spokane Daily Chronicle confirmed he had injured his hand and had to take a three-week break before continuing his sparring with Benny Leonard at Leonard's training camp.

On December 24, 1919, Joe made a poor showing fighting Joe Welling at the Olympia Athletic Club in Philadelphia. He had previously beaten Welling on December 4 in New Jersey. Boxing historian Ken Blady believes Benjamin had fought with a fever that day, and had problems with injuries to his hands, an issue which occurred frequently in his boxing career. Though he had fought lightweight champion Leonard once, this single poor showing reduced his chances of a sanctioned championship shot, which many of his fans believed he was due. He decided to return to California to treat his arthritic hands, but against the sage advice of his gifted manager Billy Gibson, took a bout with Ritchie Mitchell on his way out west and was knocked out in the ninth in Milwaukee. It was the first time in 200 bouts Benjamin would be called out for the count.

Returning to the West coast, he defeated Harry Schuman decisively in a ten-round points decision in Portland, Oregon on December 22, 1920. The Spokane Daily Chronicle noted that "the Spokane Battler (Benjamin) had all the better of the argument and almost registered a knockout in the second round by sending Schuman to the mat."

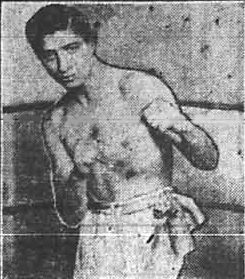
Benny Valgar, Top Lightweight Contender

Returning to the East coast after six months of recuperation, he beat Pete Hartley twice in Madison Square Garden, and in an historic win he outboxed gifted lightweight contender Benny Valgar in a twelve-round points decision in New York in July 1921.

On December 26, 1921, he fought eight rounds with fellow Jewish boxer Joe Tiplitz before an enthusiastic audience at the new Olympia Athletic Club in Philadelphia, losing in a close bout by newspaper decision.

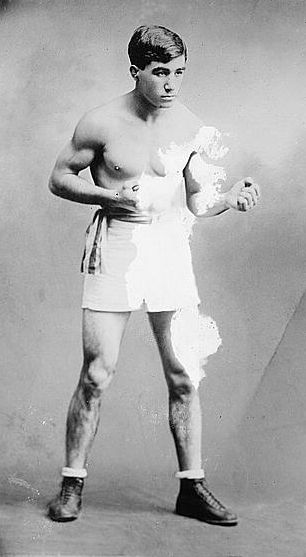
Johnny Dundee Jr. Lightweight Champion

Perhaps in his single most historic fight, and one that should have been a lightweight championship bout, he fought reigning World Jr. Lightweight Champion Johnny Dundee in a classic fifteen round bout on February 3, 1922, before a packed house in Madison Square Garden. The fight could have ended differently. Dundee won but faced a very tough challenge in the early to late rounds. Benjamin subsequently took a tour of Europe with friend Jack Dempsey with whom he trained, and hall of fame boxing writer Damon Runyon. Returning to America in May of that year, he fought again in Philadelphia, before returning to Los Angeles where he beat his old opponent Phil Salvadore and his brother Mike before crowds of adoring fans in four round events at his old home, Vernon Arena.

In front of 20,000 fans, on February 25, 1924, in Recreation Park in San Francisco, he narrowly defeated Jack Silver, rated third nationally, and took the Pacific Coast Lightweight championship. According to BoxRec, this fight was part of the NYSAC elimination bout for Benny Leonard's vacant Lightweight Crown. Benjamin, as evidenced by his knockout ratio, was the stronger puncher in the bout.

But his streak had to end, particularly with his health issues pressing. On April 8, 1925, he took on a younger Ace Hudkins, perhaps underestimating his talent, and received a painful defeat. His ailing hands, which had bothered him greatly in 1924, plagued him in the bout and by the end he had broken his right hand in several places. He made the decision to retire, and was quoted as saying, "If I can't beat a young kid like Hudkins with all my skill and experience, then I have no right to be a world champion."

== Retirement, movie career, and life after boxing ==
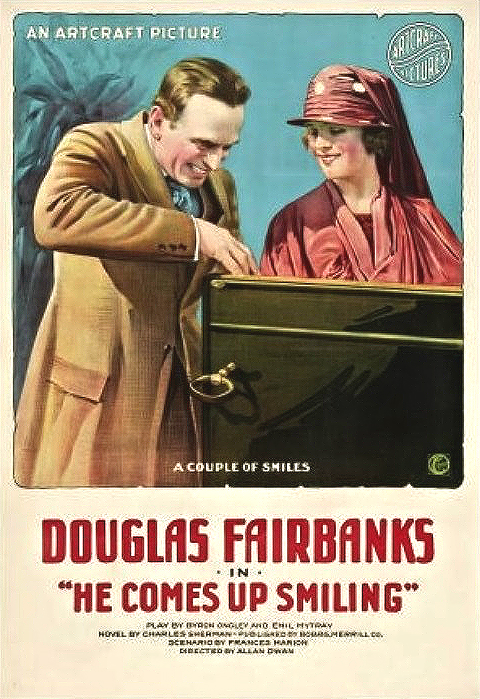

His first attempt at movies was during his employ with Douglas Fairbanks when he appeared as an uncredited extra in Fairbank Productions' 1918 silent film He Comes Up Smiling. He appeared in others of Fairbank's films in small roles during this period. One of the actors in the movie was Bull Montana, formerly a wrestler, and also a close associate of Fairbanks who around 1924 offered to help his friend, boxer Abe Hollandersky finance his autobiography.

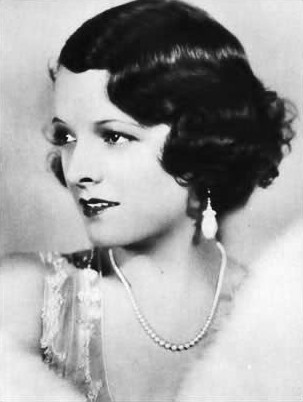
Marion Nixon

He wed actress Marion Nixon after moving to Hollywood around 1925.

On July 5, 1929, having divorced Marion Nixon two years prior, he announced an engagement to New York show girl Agnes O'Laughlin.

After boxing, he considered returning to movies, but had greater success and a stronger interest in buying a stable of horses. Two of his most successful horses were Atlante, and Joe Benjamin. He became a bookmaker at a track in Tijuana, and handled the business affairs of jockey Clarence Kummer, rider of racing great Man o' War.

In World War II he served as a private in the Marines. After the war, he worked as a liquor salesman and did public relations as a west coast representative for Schenley Industries.

He died in San Francisco on July 6, 1983, and was buried in Colma in San Mateo County.
