= Fred Bretonnel =

French boxer

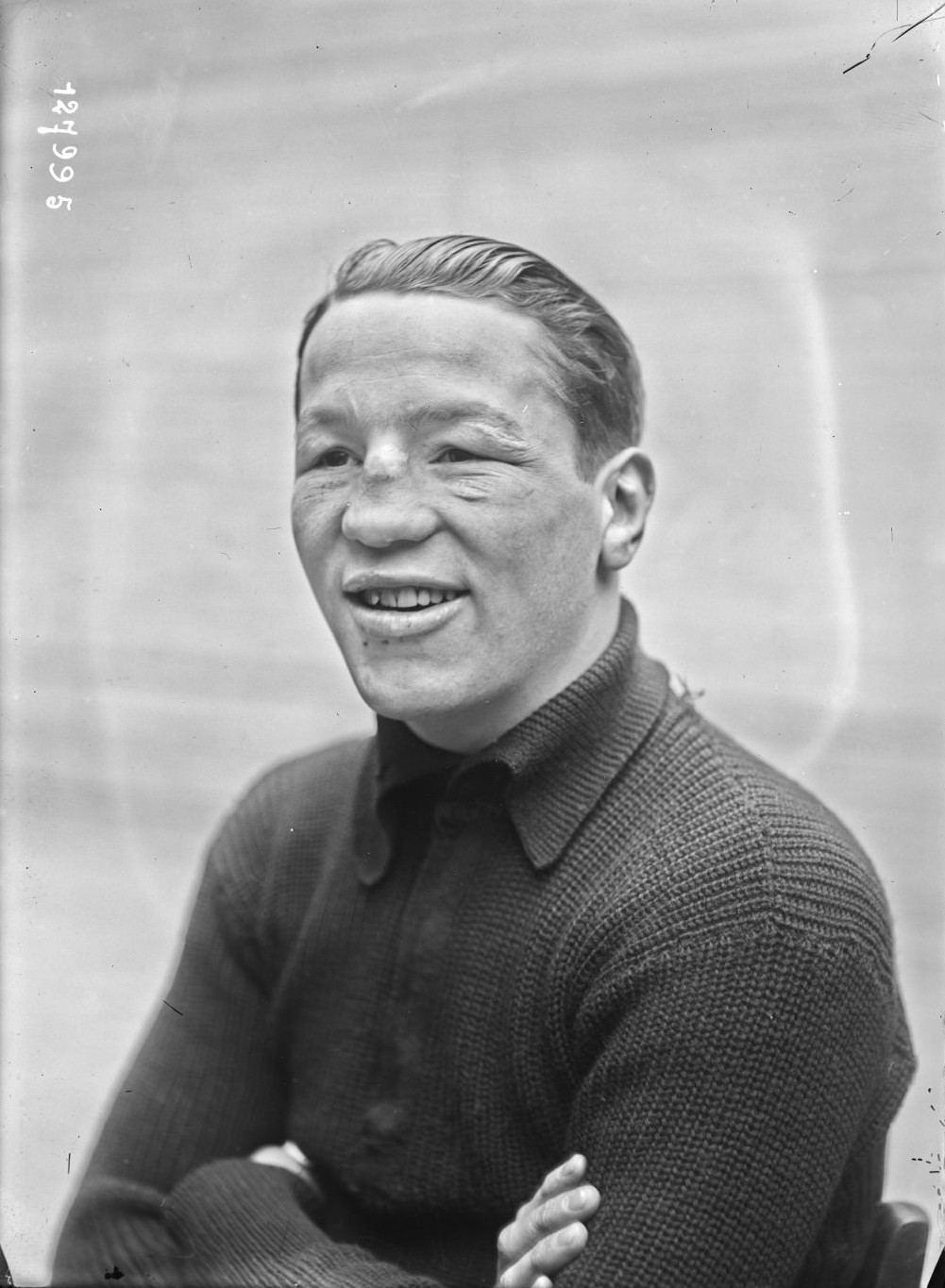

Personal information
- Nationality: (France) French
- Born: 1 January 1905 Paris, France
- Died: 4 September 1928 (aged 23)
- Weight: lightweight

Boxing career

Boxing record
- Total fights: 76
- Wins: 42
- Win by KO: 13
- Losses: 18
- Draws: 14
- No contests: 2

Fred Bretonnel (1 January 1905 – 4 September 1928) was a French lightweight boxer and title holder of the Featherweight Championship of France from 24 June to 7 October 1924, when it was taken by Lucien Vinez.

In a career totalling 76 matches, he lost 18, drew 14 and won 42 with 14 knock outs.

He fought in the first French-German match in France after the First World War, on 10 May 1922, defeating Paul Czirson.

Bretonnel's family was also strongly associated with boxing. His brother was a professional boxing trainer and manager, and his father started the first boxing magazine in France.

Bretonnel died from suicide by hanging on 4 September 1928, due to what was referred to as "family troubles". At the time of his death, he was a welterweight.
