= Herring (surname) =

Herring is a surname which may refer to:

== People ==
- Aggie Herring (1876–1939), American actress
- Alfred Cecil Herring (1888–1966), Royal Army Service Corps officer
- Amy H. Herring, American biostatistician
- Annie Herring (born 1945), American Christian singer
- Art Herring (1906–1995), American baseball player
- Aubrey Herring (born 1978), American track and field athlete
- Augustus Moore Herring (1865–1926), American aviation pioneer
- Ben Herring (born 1980), New Zealand rugby union footballer
- Bill Herring, American baseball player
- Caroline Herring, singer-songwriter
- Charles R. Herring (born 1945), chiropractor who served in the Louisiana House of Representatives from 1988 to 1992
- Clyde L. Herring (1879–1945), American politician
- Conyers Herring (1914–2009), American physicist
- Corey Herring, American basketball player
- Cornelius T. Herring (1849–1931), American rancher, banker and hotelier.
- Dennis Herring, American record producer
- E. Pendleton Herring (1903–2004), American political scientist
- Edmund Herring (1892–1982), Australian Army officer
- Eli Herring, American football player
- Elijah Herring, American football player
- Elizabeth Warren, née Herring (born 1949), American politician
- Frances Elizabeth Herring (1851-1916), Canadian journalist and novelist
- Hal Herring (1924–2014), American football player and coach
- Hank Herring (1922–1999), American boxer
- Heath Herring (born 1978), American mixed martial artist
- Horace Herring (1884–1962), New Zealand politician
- Jamel Herring (1985), American boxer
- James Red Herring (1896–1974), American boxer
- James V. Herring (1887–1969), American artist
- Jan Herring (1923–2000), American artist
- Jimmy Herring (born 1962), American rock guitarist
- Joanne Herring (born 1929), American entrepreneur, philanthropist, and talk show host
- John Frederick Herring Sr. (1795–1865), British painter
- John Frederick Herring Jr. (1820–1907), British painter
- Katherine Herring (1933–2018), All-American Girls Professional Baseball League player
- Kim Herring (born 1975), American football player
- Laraine Herring (born 1968), American writer
- Louise McCarren Herring (1909–1987), American cooperative activist
- Lynn Herring (born 1958), American soap opera actress
- Malik Herring (born 1997), American football player
- Mark Herring (born 1961), American politician
- Mary Herring (1895–1981), Australian physician and community worker
- Pembroke J. Herring (1930–2020), American film editor
- Percy Herring (1872–1967) New Zealand physician
- Reggie Herring (born 1959), American football coach
- Richard Herring (born 1967), British comedian
- Robert Herring (poet), Scottish poet
- Robert Herring (businessman), American entrepreneur
- Robert Herring (RAF officer) (1896–1973), World War I flying ace
- Robert Herring (cricketer) (1898–1964), Australian cricketer
- Rufus G. Herring (1921–1996), United States Naval Reserve officer
- Samuel T. Herring (born 1984), American singer
- Scarlett Miller (née Herring), American engineering professor
- Sydney Herring (1881–1951), Australian Army colonel
- Thomas Herring (1693–1757), Archbishop of Canterbury
- Thomas A. Herring (born 1955), Australian-American geophysicist
- Vincent Herring (born 1964), American jazz saxophonist
- William Herring (1718–1774), Anglican priest
- William Herring (politician) (1833–1912), American politician, lawyer, and businessman
- Will Herring (born 1983), American football player

== Fictional characters ==
- Albert Herring, from the 1947 comic chamber opera by Benjamin Britten
- A henchman of dictator Adenoid Hynkel in The Great Dictator

== See also ==
- Senator Herring (disambiguation)
