= Robert Herring =

Robert Herring may refer to:

- Robert Herring (poet) (1903–1975), British writer and poet
- Robert Herring (businessman), California businessman and founder of Wealth TV
- Robert Herring (RAF officer) (1896–1973), World War I flying ace
- Robert Herring (cricketer) (1898–1964), Australian cricketer
