= Young Stribling =

American boxer (1904–1933)

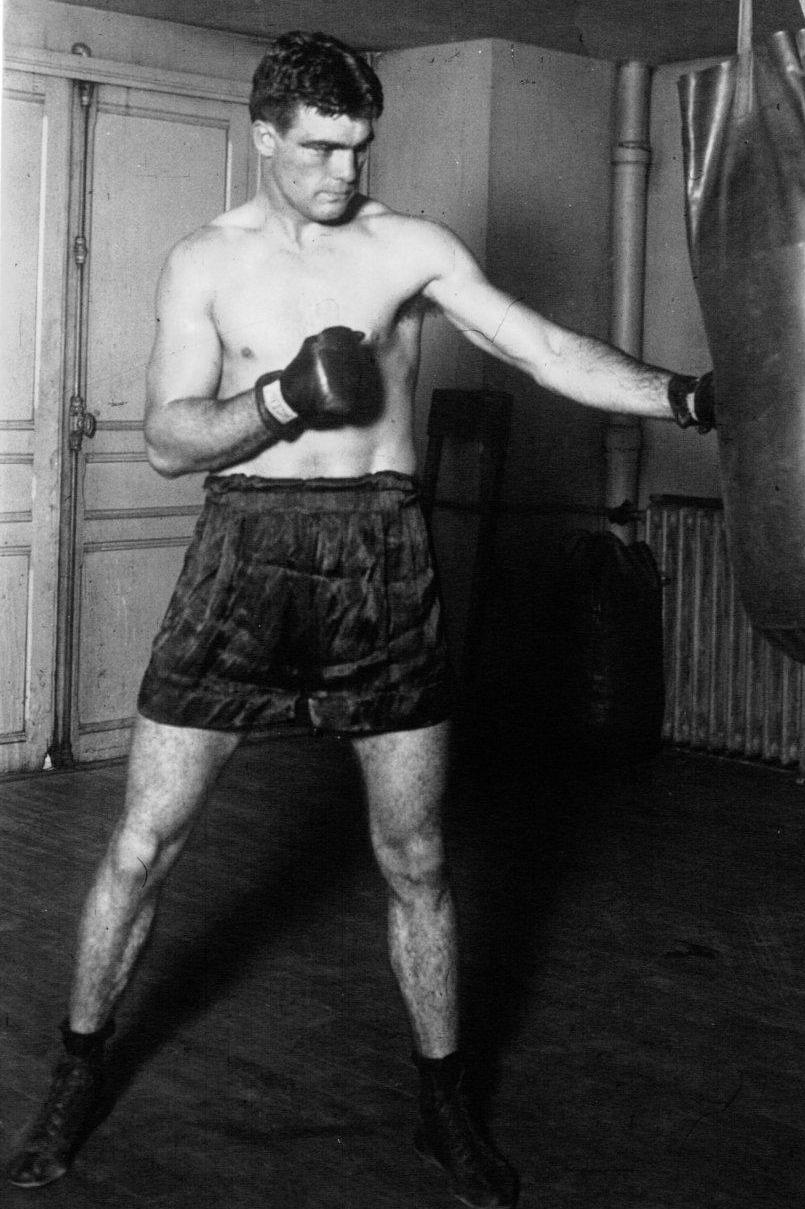

Personal information
- Nickname: King of the Canebrakes
- Born: William Lawrence Stribling Jr. December 26, 1904 Bainbridge, Georgia, U.S.
- Died: October 3, 1933 (aged 28) Macon, Georgia, U.S.
- Weight: Heavyweight; Light heavyweight Middleweight; Welterweight; Lightweight; Featherweight

Boxing career
- Stance: Orthodox

Boxing record
- Total fights: 291
- Wins: 256
- Win by KO: 129
- Losses: 16
- Draws: 17
- No contests: 2

William Lawrence Stribling Jr. (December 26, 1904 – October 3, 1933), known as Young Stribling, was an American professional boxer who fought from Featherweight to Heavyweight. His 1931 fight against Max Schmeling for Schmeling's world heavyweight championship was named Ring Magazine fight of the year. Stribling was inducted into the Georgia Sports Hall of Fame in 1965, and the International Boxing Hall of Fame in 1996.

== Personal life ==
Born in Bainbridge, Georgia, on December 26, 1904. Stribling's mother claimed she wanted him to be a boxer from the time he was a baby. "When he was two years old, I started him on leg and arm exercises," she told an interviewer. Stribling was raised as a vegetarian.

"Strib" celebrated his 21st birthday by marrying Clara Kinney, a student at Brenau College. Clara's father was a prominent Macon businessman, and her mother was the first woman to serve on the city council. Clara's grandfather was a former president of Wesleyan College in Macon, the oldest female college in America. "Strib" and Clara had three children, the first was W. L. Stribling III, born in 1927.

== Professional career ==
Stribling (left) in 1929

Stribling turned professional in 1921. Stribling fought 75 professional bouts while still in high school. He fought at very high frequency. From 1921 to 1929 he fought 258 times, over 28 times per year.

In a title match against light-heavyweight champion Mike McTigue the fight was declared a draw. Unhappy with the draw, the ring was surrounded by angry fans who demanded the fight be given to Stribling, which the referee did. Three hours after the fight though, he re-affirmed that it was a draw. "Unless I awarded the decision to Stribling I would never leave the arena alive," referee Harry Ertle said after the fight. The two would face again for a rematch 6 months later. Stribling convincingly outpointed McTigue, winning the match. However, in New Jersey boxing at the time a title couldn't change hands on a newspaper decision. Both fights occurred while Stribling was just 19 years old. After his bouts against McTigue, he was often referred to in newspapers as "the uncrowned light-heavyweight champion."

Paul Berlenbach took the light-heavyweight title from McTigue. Stribling had previously fought Berlenbach to a draw. In 1926 a match between the two took place. Berlenbach won the rematch decisively.

In 1928, now 24 years old, Stribling set the record for knockouts at 101. The New York Times added that "few of Stribling's recent victories were over well known fighters."

Stribling met the future heavyweight champion, Primo Carnera, in 1929 and lost on a foul. In a rematch, Carnera fouled Stribling. Each scoring a victory by disqualification. Commenting on the unsatisfactory conclusion of the two matches, sportswriter Robert Edgren commented "Stribling seems to be playing Carnera the way he has played a lot of palukas and stable mates at different towns in "the sticks" in this country. Always the return engagement."

After a string of impressive wins against Hans Schönrath, Otto Von Porat, and Phil Scott, none of which lasted more than 2 rounds. Stribling was given a shot at the heavyweight championship against Max Schmelling. It was a decisive victory for Schmelling. Stribling nearly made it to the final bell, with the referee stepping in with just 14 seconds remaining in the 15th and final round. The first and only KO or TKO loss in Stribling's 291 fight career. It was named Ring Magazine Fight of the Year for 1931.

He would fight for 2 more years and 21 more fights. Stribling was still among the top contenders when he died. His final bout came less than two weeks before his death. Defeating Maxie Rosenbloom by 10 round decision.

== Death ==
He died at 6 A.M, EST on October 3, 1933, at 28 years old, after a motorcycle accident which occurred 2 days prior in Macon, Georgia while travelling to a hospital to visit his convalescing wife and newborn. Injuries involved pelvic fracture and severe left foot damage which lead to amputation. He was buried in Riverside Cemetery (Macon, Georgia).

== Professional boxing record ==
All information in this section is derived from BoxRec, unless otherwise stated.

=== Official record ===
291 fights	224 wins	13 losses
By knockout	129	1
By decision	93	8
By disqualification	2	4
Draws	14	
No contests	2	
Newspaper decisions/draws	38	

All newspaper decisions are officially regarded as "no decision" bouts and are not counted in the win/loss/draw column.

No.	Result	Record	Opponent	Type	Round	Date	Location	Notes
291	Win	224–13–14 (40)	Maxie Rosenbloom	UD	10	Sep 22, 1933	Sam Houston Hall, Houston, Texas, U.S.	
290	Win	223–13–14 (40)	Benny O'Dell	TKO	2 (10)	Aug 29, 1933	Baseball Park, Lindale, Georgia, U.S.	
289	Win	222–13–14 (40)	George Neron	PTS	10	Aug 2, 1933	R.M.I. Park, Beckley, West Virginia, U.S.	
288	Loss	221–13–14 (40)	Pierre Charles	DQ	8 (10)	Mar 6, 1933	Palais des Sports, Paris, Paris, France	
287	Win	221–12–14 (40)	Don McCorkindale	PTS	12	Dec 17, 1932	Ellis Park Rugby Stadium, Johannesburg, Gauteng, South Africa	
286	Win	220–12–14 (40)	George Thompson	KO	6 (12)	Nov 7, 1932	His Majesty's Theatre, Perth, Western Australia, Australia	
285	Win	219–12–14 (40)	Tony Gora	TKO	6 (12)	Nov 3, 1932	Exhibition Building, Adelaide, South Australia, Australia	
284	NC	218–12–14 (40)	Johnny Freeman	NC	8 (12)	Oct 29, 1932	Sydney Stadium, Sydney, New South Wales, Australia	The bout was declared a no contest after both boxers "continued to engage in hostilities after the bell" ending the 8th round
283	Win	218–12–14 (39)	Johnny Freeman	PTS	15	Sep 22, 1932	West Melbourne Stadium, Melbourne, Victoria, Australia	
282	Win	217–12–14 (39)	Jack Renault	RTD	5 (15)	Aug 10, 1932	Brisbane Stadium, Brisbane, Queensland, Australia	
281	Win	216–12–14 (39)	Frankie Wine	PTS	15	Jul 25, 1932	Sydney Stadium, Sydney, New South Wales, Australia	
280	Win	215–12–14 (39)	Ambrose Palmer	TKO	10 (15)	Jul 4, 1932	Sydney Stadium, Sydney, New South Wales, Australia	
279	Win	214–12–14 (39)	Johnny Freeman	NWS	10	May 30, 1932	Huntsville, Alabama, U.S.	
278	Win	214–12–14 (38)	Big Sid Terris	KO	5 (10)	May 23, 1932	Winston-Salem, North Carolina, U.S.	
277	Win	213–12–14 (38)	Joe Doctor	PTS	10	May 16, 1932	Toronto, Ontario, Canada	Doctor disqualified for "stalling"
276	Win	212–12–14 (38)	George Neron	PTS	10	May 10, 1932	Central Tobacco Warehouse, Johnson City, Tennessee, U.S.	
275	Loss	211–12–14 (38)	Ernie Schaaf	PTS	10	Feb 26, 1932	Chicago Stadium, Chicago, Illinois, U.S.	
274	Win	211–11–14 (38)	Pietro Corri	NWS	10	Nov 23, 1931	Birmingham, Alabama, U.S.	
273	Win	211–11–14 (37)	Pat Fay	KO	3 (10)	Nov 11, 1931	Muskogee, Oklahoma, U.S.	
272	Win	210–11–14 (37)	Red Fitzsimmons	TKO	4 (10)	Nov 3, 1931	Shrine Mosque, Springfield, Missouri, U.S.	
271	Win	209–11–14 (37)	Salvatore Ruggirello	KO	2 (10)	Oct 19, 1931	Forum, Wichita, Kansas, U.S.	
270	Loss	208–11–14 (37)	Max Schmeling	TKO	15 (15)	Jul 3, 1931	Municipal Stadium, Cleveland, Ohio, U.S.	For NBA and The Ring heavyweight titles
269	Win	208–10–14 (37)	Tuffy Griffiths	UD	10	Dec 12, 1930	Chicago Stadium, Chicago, Illinois, U.S.	
268	Win	207–10–14 (37)	Whitey Gorsline	TKO	3 (10)	Nov 19, 1930	Grand Rapids, Michigan, U.S.	
267	Win	206–10–14 (37)	Arthur De Kuh	PTS	10	Nov 11, 1930	Spiller's Ballpark, Atlanta, Georgia, U.S.	
266	Win	205–10–14 (37)	KO Christner	TKO	3 (10)	Oct 31, 1930	Arena, Boston, Massachusetts, U.S.	
265	Win	204–10–14 (37)	Phil Scott	KO	2 (15)	Jul 28, 1930	Wimbledon Stadium, Wimbledon, London, England, U.K.	
264	Win	203–10–14 (37)	Otto von Porat	KO	1 (10)	Jun 20, 1930	Chicago Stadium, Chicago, Illinois, U.S.	
263	Win	202–10–14 (37)	Frankie Wine	NWS	6	Jun 5, 1930	Birmingham, Alabama, U.S.	
262	Win	202–10–14 (36)	Hans Schönrath	TKO	2 (10)	May 8, 1930	Royal Albert Hall, Kensington, London, England, U.K.	
261	Win	201–10–14 (36)	Pietro Corri	PTS	10	Feb 21, 1930	Benjamin Field Arena, Tampa, Florida, U.S.	
260	Win	200–10–14 (36)	Joe Packo	KO	8 (10)	Feb 17, 1930	Coliseum Arena, New Orleans, Louisiana, U.S.	
259	Win	199–10–14 (36)	Jack DeMave	KO	1 (10)	Jan 22, 1930	Auditorium, Atlanta, Georgia, U.S.	
258	Win	198–10–14 (36)	Primo Carnera	DQ	7 (10)	Dec 7, 1929	Velodrome d'Hiver, Paris, Paris, France	Carnera struck Stribling from behind after the bell ended the seventh round. The bout was probably fixed
257	Loss	197–10–14 (36)	Primo Carnera	DQ	4 (15)	Nov 18, 1929	Royal Albert Hall, Kensington, London, England, U.K.	Both fighters down in the third. Carnera down from low blow in 4th. This bout was probably fixed
256	Win	197–9–14 (36)	Maurice Griselle	PTS	10	Nov 6, 1929	Cirque de Paris, Paris, Paris, France	
255	Win	196–9–14 (36)	Johnny Gibson	KO	3 (10)	Sep 24, 1929	Tobacco Warehouse, Cairo, Georgia, U.S.	
254	Win	195–9–14 (36)	George Cook	TKO	8 (10)	Sep 2, 1929	Municipal Auditorium, Macon, Georgia, U.S.	
253	Win	194–9–14 (36)	Joe Packo	NWS	10	Aug 30, 1929	Coliseum, Evansville, Indiana, U.S.	
252	Win	194–9–14 (35)	Frankie Wine	PTS	8	Aug 29, 1929	Sulphur Dell, Nashville, Tennessee, U.S.	
251	Win	193–9–14 (35)	Joe Sekyra	NWS	10	Aug 19, 1929	Convention Hall, Kansas City, Missouri, U.S.	
250	Win	193–9–14 (34)	Harry Fay	KO	5 (10)	Aug 12, 1929	Little Rock, Arkansas, U.S.	
249	Loss	192–9–14 (34)	Babe Hunt	DQ	6 (10)	Jul 29, 1929	McNulty Park, Tulsa, Oklahoma, U.S.	A right hand punch to the groin disqualified Stribling
248	Win	192–8–14 (34)	George Cook	NWS	10	Jul 18, 1929	Muehlebach Field, Kansas City, Missouri, U.S.	
247	Win	192–8–14 (33)	Jack DeMave	PTS	8	Jul 11, 1929	Sterchi Park Arena, Knoxville, Tennessee, U.S.	
246	Win	191–8–14 (33)	Tony Fuente	KO	2 (10)	Jul 4, 1929	City Auditorium, Birmingham, Alabama, U.S.	
245	Win	190–8–14 (33)	Jack Lee	KO	8 (10)	Jun 24, 1929	Flint, Michigan, U.S.	
244	Win	189–8–14 (33)	Babe Hunt	NWS	10	Jun 17, 1929	Forum, Wichita, Kansas, U.S.	
243	Loss	189–8–14 (32)	Jack Sharkey	PTS	10	Feb 27, 1929	Flamingo Park, Miami Beach, Florida, U.S.	
242	Win	189–7–14 (32)	Ralph Smith	TKO	3 (10)	Jan 25, 1929	Coliseum Arena, New Orleans, Louisiana, U.S.	
241	Win	188–7–14 (32)	Sully Montgomery	KO	2 (8)	Jan 21, 1929	Memphis, Tennessee, U.S.	
240	Win	187–7–14 (32)	Art Malay	KO	3 (10)	Jan 18, 1929	Norfolk, Virginia, U.S.	
239	Win	186–7–14 (32)	Tommy Stone	KO	2 (10)	Jan 9, 1929	Durham, North Carolina, U.S.	
238	Win	185–7–14 (32)	Jack League	KO	1 (10)	Jan 1, 1929	Kansas City, Missouri, U.S.	
237	Win	184–7–14 (32)	Jack Blackstock	KO	2 (10)	Dec 21, 1928	Imperial Theatre, Augusta, Georgia, U.S.	
236	Win	183–7–14 (32)	Andres Castano	KO	2 (10)	Dec 20, 1928	Macon, Georgia, U.S.	
235	Win	182–7–14 (32)	Billy Freas	TKO	1 (10)	Dec 18, 1928	Coliseum, Saint Louis, Missouri, U.S.	
234	Win	181–7–14 (32)	Ray Neuman	KO	6 (10)	Nov 30, 1928	Auditorium, Charlotte, North Carolina, U.S.	
233	Win	180–7–14 (32)	Big Sid Terris	KO	3 (10)	Oct 30, 1928	Auditorium, Atlanta, Georgia, U.S.	
232	Win	179–7–14 (32)	Frankie Wine	NWS	10	Sep 20, 1928	Grand Rapids, Michigan, U.S.	
231	Win	179–7–14 (31)	Johnny Squires	TKO	2 (10)	Sep 6, 1928	Madison Square Garden, Manhattan, New York City, New York, U.S.	
230	Win	178–7–14 (31)	Martin Burke	TKO	1 (10)	Aug 13, 1928	Mobile, Alabama, U.S.	
229	Win	177–7–14 (31)	Jack Van Ryan	KO	2 (10)	Aug 6, 1928	Wilmington, North Carolina, U.S.	
228	Win	176–7–14 (31)	Bill Jordan	KO	1 (10)	Jul 24, 1928	High Point, North Carolina, U.S.	
227	Win	175–7–14 (31)	Tom Kirby	PTS	10	Jul 20, 1928	Englewood Celtic Park, Chicago, Illinois, U.S.	
226	Win	174–7–14 (31)	Bucky Harris	KO	3 (10)	Jul 4, 1928	Macon, Georgia, U.S.	
225	Win	173–7–14 (31)	Wild Bill Rowe	KO	2 (?)	Jul 2, 1928	Burgoyne Isle, Daytona Beach, Florida, U.S.	
224	Win	172–7–14 (31)	Joe Packo	KO	7 (10)	Jun 12, 1928	Cramton Bowl, Montgomery, Alabama, U.S.	
223	Win	171–7–14 (31)	Harry Fay	PTS	10	Jun 7, 1928	Jacksonville, Florida, U.S.	
222	Win	170–7–14 (31)	Ted Cook	KO	3 (10)	Jun 5, 1928	Meridian, Mississippi, U.S.	
221	Win	169–7–14 (31)	Joe King	KO	2 (10)	Jun 1, 1928	Meridian, Mississippi, U.S.	
220	Win	168–7–14 (31)	Johnny Urban	TKO	5 (8)	May 30, 1928	Chattanooga, Tennessee, U.S.	
219	Win	167–7–14 (31)	Tommy Stone	KO	1 (10)	May 25, 1928	Albany, New York, U.S.	
218	Win	166–7–14 (31)	Charley Rammell	KO	2 (?)	May 22, 1928	Pensacola, Florida, U.S.	
217	Win	165–7–14 (31)	Marcello Gubinelli	KO	1 (10)	May 18, 1928	Benjamin Field Arena, Tampa, Florida, U.S.	
216	Win	164–7–14 (31)	Pete Ankelos	KO	2 (10)	May 9, 1928	Tinker Field, Orlando, Florida, U.S.	
215	Win	163–7–14 (31)	Andres Castano	KO	2 (10)	May 8, 1928	Legion Arena, West Palm Beach, Florida, U.S.	
214	Win	162–7–14 (31)	Russ Rowsey	TKO	2 (10)	Apr 30, 1928	Coliseum, Coral Gables, Florida, U.S.	
213	Win	161–7–14 (31)	Joe White	KO	2 (?)	Apr 23, 1928	Chattanooga, Tennessee, U.S.	
212	Win	160–7–14 (31)	Italian Jack Herman	KO	2 (10)	Apr 17, 1928	Jacksonville, Florida, U.S.	
211	Win	159–7–14 (31)	George Gemas	KO	3 (?)	Apr 11, 1928	Goldsboro, North Carolina, U.S.	
210	Win	158–7–14 (31)	Jack Blackstock	KO	2 (10)	Apr 2, 1928	Legion Coliseum, Sarasota, Florida, U.S.	
209	Win	157–7–14 (31)	Earl Blue	TKO	2 (10)	Mar 30, 1928	Benjamin Field Arena, Tampa, Florida, U.S.	
208	Win	156–7–14 (31)	Pat Joyce	KO	1 (10)	Mar 16, 1928	New Baseball Stadium, Augusta, Georgia, U.S.	
207	Win	155–7–14 (31)	George Avera	KO	2 (10)	Mar 12, 1928	Dothan, Alabama, U.S.	
206	Win	154–7–14 (31)	Chuck Wiggins	PTS	12	Mar 6, 1928	Public Hall, Cleveland, Ohio, U.S.	
205	Win	153–7–14 (31)	Al Friedman	KO	2 (10)	Feb 27, 1928	Coliseum, Coral Gables, Florida, U.S.	
204	Win	152–7–14 (31)	Joe Clancy	KO	2 (10)	Feb 23, 1928	Montgomery, Alabama, U.S.	
203	Win	151–7–14 (31)	Tom Maxted	KO	2 (10)	Feb 7, 1928	Jacksonville, Florida, U.S.	
202	Win	150–7–14 (31)	Marine Tolliver	KO	2 (?)	Feb 6, 1928	Birmingham, Alabama, U.S.	
201	Win	149–7–14 (31)	Chuck Burns	PTS	10	Jan 30, 1928	Tulsa, Oklahoma, U.S.	
200	Win	148–7–14 (31)	Martin Burke	KO	1 (10)	Jan 23, 1928	Coliseum, Coral Gables, Florida, U.S.	
199	Win	147–7–14 (31)	Chuck Wiggins	NWS	10	Jan 9, 1928	Forum, Wichita, Kansas, U.S.	
198	Win	147–7–14 (30)	Tom Kirby	UD	10	Dec 15, 1927	South Main Street Armory, Wilkes-Barre, Pennsylvania, U.S.	
197	Win	146–7–14 (30)	Lou Scozza	PTS	10	Dec 9, 1927	Broadway Auditorium, Buffalo, New York, U.S.	
196	Win	145–7–14 (30)	Andy Kid Palmer	TKO	6 (10)	Nov 21, 1927	Valdosta, Georgia, U.S.	
195	Win	144–7–14 (30)	Angus Snyder	PTS	6	Nov 8, 1927	Arena, Dishman, Washington, U.S.	
194	Win	143–7–14 (30)	Harry Dillon	PTS	10	Nov 4, 1927	Ice Coliseum, Portland, Oregon, U.S.	
193	Win	142–7–14 (30)	Mike Arnold	KO	4 (10)	Oct 28, 1927	Wichita, Kansas, U.S.	
192	NC	141–7–14 (30)	Leo Deibel	NC	6 (10)	Sep 6, 1927	Auditorium, Omaha, Nebraska, U.S.	Diebel and Stribling were arrested by Inspector of Detectives, Ben Banbaum on charges of participating in a sham/framed fight
191	Win	141–7–14 (29)	Ed Smith	KO	3 (?)	Aug 29, 1927	Tulsa, Oklahoma, U.S.	
190	Draw	140–7–14 (29)	Chuck Wiggins	NWS	10	Aug 25, 1927	Washington Park, Indianapolis, Indiana, U.S.	
189	Win	140–7–14 (28)	Otto von Porat	NWS	10	Jul 21, 1927	Municipal Auditorium, Minneapolis, Minnesota, U.S.	
188	Win	140–7–14 (27)	Chuck Wiggins	DQ	6 (10)	Jul 4, 1927	Macon, Georgia, U.S.	
187	Win	139–7–14 (27)	Tiny Jim Herman	PTS	10	May 19, 1927	Golden Park, Columbus, Ohio, U.S.	
186	Win	138–7–14 (27)	Jimmy Byrne	NWS	12	May 13, 1927	Jefferson County Armory, Louisville, Kentucky, U.S.	
185	Loss	138–7–14 (26)	Tommy Loughran	UD	10	May 3, 1927	Ebbets Field, Brooklyn, New York City, New York, U.S.	
184	Win	138–6–14 (26)	Benny Ross	PTS	10	Apr 18, 1927	Broadway Auditorium, Buffalo, New York, U.S.	
183	Win	137–6–14 (26)	Jack Melrose	KO	2 (8)	Apr 7, 1927	Memphis, Tennessee, U.S.	
182	Win	136–6–14 (26)	Red Fitzsimmons	TKO	4 (10)	Apr 4, 1927	Canton Auditorium, Canton, Ohio, U.S.	
181	Win	135–6–14 (26)	Art Weigand	TKO	7 (10)	Mar 23, 1927	Broadway Auditorium, Buffalo, New York, U.S.	
180	Win	134–6–14 (26)	Maxie Rosenbloom	PTS	10	Mar 17, 1927	Mechanics Building, Boston, Massachusetts, U.S.	
179	Win	133–6–14 (26)	Eddie Civil	KO	2 (10)	Mar 10, 1927	Macon, Georgia, U.S.	
178	Win	132–6–14 (26)	Leo Gates	TKO	5 (10)	Mar 3, 1927	Auditorium, Atlanta, Georgia, U.S.	
177	Win	131–6–14 (26)	Eddie Huffman	PTS	10	Feb 7, 1927	Madison Square Garden, Manhattan, New York City, New York, U.S.	
176	Win	130–6–14 (26)	Joe Lohman	KO	7 (10)	Dec 20, 1926	Macon, Georgia, U.S.	
175	Win	129–6–14 (26)	Big Boy Peterson	TKO	5 (10)	Nov 26, 1926	Benjamin Field Arena, Tampa, Florida, U.S.	
174	Win	128–6–14 (26)	Ed Smith	PTS	10	Nov 18, 1926	Miami Field, Miami, Florida, U.S.	
173	Win	127–6–14 (26)	Battling Levinsky	NWS	10	Nov 11, 1926	Coliseum, Des Moines, Iowa, U.S.	
172	Win	127–6–14 (25)	Soldier Buck	KO	4 (12)	Oct 18, 1926	Jefferson County Armory, Louisville, Kentucky, U.S.	
171	Win	126–6–14 (25)	Lou Rollinger	TKO	3 (10)	Oct 15, 1926	Cattle Congress Hippodrome, Waterloo, Iowa, U.S.	
170	Win	125–6–14 (25)	Frankie Bush	TKO	6 (8)	Sep 30, 1926	Memphis, Tennessee, U.S.	This bout may have taken place on September 29, 1926
169	Win	124–6–14 (25)	Chuck Burns	PTS	10	Sep 21, 1926	Auditorium, Atlanta, Georgia, U.S.	
168	Win	123–6–14 (25)	Buck Aston	TKO	9 (10)	Sep 17, 1926	Benjamin Field Arena, Tampa, Florida, U.S.	
167	Loss	122–6–14 (25)	Paul Berlenbach	UD	15	Jun 10, 1926	Yankee Stadium, Bronx, New York City, New York, U.S.	For NYSAC, NBA, and The Ring light-heavyweight titles
166	Win	122–5–14 (25)	Ray Neuman	PTS	10	May 24, 1926	Auditorium, Atlanta, Georgia, U.S.	
165	Win	121–5–14 (25)	Johnny Risko	PTS	10	May 14, 1926	Madison Square Garden, Manhattan, New York City, New York, U.S.	
164	Win	120–5–14 (25)	Mike Wallace	KO	3 (8)	Apr 26, 1926	Stadium, Memphis, Tennessee, U.S.	
163	Win	119–5–14 (25)	Billy Britton	KO	3 (10)	Apr 25, 1926	Topeka, Kansas, U.S.	
162	Win	118–5–14 (25)	Joe Lohman	NWS	10	Apr 20, 1926	Kansas City, Kansas, U.S.	
161	Win	118–5–14 (24)	Tommy Marvin	KO	3 (10)	Apr 13, 1926	Oklahoma City, Oklahoma, U.S.	
160	Win	117–5–14 (24)	Chuck Burns	NWS	10	Apr 12, 1926	Forum, Wichita, Kansas, U.S.	
159	Win	117–5–14 (23)	Jimmy Slattery	PTS	10	Mar 25, 1926	Madison Square Garden, Manhattan, New York City, New York, U.S.	
158	Win	116–5–14 (23)	Tom Burns	NWS	10	Dec 4, 1925	Grand Rapids, Michigan, U.S.	
157	Win	116–5–14 (22)	Billy Britton	TKO	1 (15)	Nov 27, 1925	Coliseum Arena, New Orleans, Louisiana, U.S.	
156	Win	115–5–14 (22)	George Cook	PTS	10	Nov 7, 1925	Municipal Stadium, Columbus, Georgia, U.S.	
155	Win	114–5–14 (22)	Soldier Buck	KO	3 (8)	Nov 2, 1925	Memphis, Tennessee, U.S.	
154	Win	113–5–14 (22)	Tom McKiernan	KO	2 (10)	Oct 22, 1925	State Fair Grounds, Columbia, South Carolina, U.S.	
153	Win	112–5–14 (22)	Eddie Huffman	PTS	10	Oct 10, 1925	Ascot Park, Los Angeles, California, U.S.	
152	Win	111–5–14 (22)	Peck Warren	KO	6 (10)	Aug 31, 1925	Dallas, Texas, U.S.	
151	Win	110–5–14 (22)	Jack League	KO	4 (12)	Aug 27, 1925	Fort Sam Houston, San Antonio, Texas, U.S.	
150	Win	109–5–14 (22)	Red Fitzsimmons	KO	3 (12)	Aug 25, 1925	Fort Bliss Arena, El Paso, Texas, U.S.	
149	Win	108–5–14 (22)	Sergeant Jack Lynch	TKO	9 (10)	Aug 21, 1925	Capital City Arena, Phoenix, Arizona, U.S.	
148	Win	107–5–14 (22)	Jimmy Delaney	PTS	10	Aug 18, 1925	Arena, Vernon, California, U.S.	
147	Win	106–5–14 (22)	Johnny Lee	KO	2 (10)	Aug 4, 1925	Salt Lake City, Utah, U.S.	
146	Win	105–5–14 (22)	Harvey Perkins	PTS	10	Jul 28, 1925	Colorado Springs, Colorado, U.S.	
145	Win	104–5–14 (22)	Jack Matlock	TKO	3 (10)	Jul 17, 1925	Wichita, Kansas, U.S.	
144	Win	103–5–14 (22)	Billy Freas	KO	7 (10)	Jul 9, 1925	Grand Rapids, Michigan, U.S.	
143	Win	102–5–14 (22)	Johnny Risko	NWS	10	Jul 2, 1925	East Chicago, Indiana, U.S.	
142	Win	102–5–14 (21)	Bud Gorman	MD	10	Jun 29, 1925	Arena Gardens, Detroit, Michigan, U.S.	
141	Win	101–5–14 (21)	George Cook	PTS	10	Jun 15, 1925	Mechanics Building, Boston, Massachusetts, U.S.	
140	Win	100–5–14 (21)	Frankie Simms	KO	3 (12)	Jun 8, 1925	Carlin's Park, Baltimore, Maryland, U.S.	
139	Win	99–5–14 (21)	Buck Brady	KO	3 (10)	Jun 2, 1925	Grand Theater, Greensboro, North Carolina, U.S.	
138	Win	98–5–14 (21)	Chief Metoquah	NWS	10	May 25, 1925	Convention Hall, Hutchinson, Kansas, U.S.	
137	Win	98–5–14 (20)	Hugh Walker	NWS	10	May 19, 1925	Kansas City, Missouri, U.S.	
136	Win	98–5–14 (19)	Quintin Romero Rojas	TKO	4 (10)	May 7, 1925	Mechanics Building, Boston, Massachusetts, U.S.	
135	Win	97–5–14 (19)	Hugh Walker	PTS	10	Apr 7, 1925	Warren Park, Augusta, Georgia, U.S.	
134	Win	96–5–14 (19)	Tommy Loughran	PTS	10	Mar 28, 1925	Recreation Park, San Francisco, California, U.S.	
133	Win	95–5–14 (19)	Harry Fay	PTS	10	Mar 9, 1925	Motor Square Garden, Pittsburgh, Pennsylvania, U.S.	
132	Win	94–5–14 (19)	Dan O'Dowd	NWS	10	Mar 3, 1925	Kalamazoo, Michigan, U.S.	
131	Loss	94–5–14 (18)	Jimmy Delaney	NWS	10	Feb 27, 1925	Auditorium, Milwaukee, Wisconsin, U.S.	
130	Win	94–5–14 (17)	Ted Jamieson	KO	6 (10)	Feb 20, 1925	Savannah, Georgia, U.S.	
129	Win	93–5–14 (17)	Joe Burke	KO	3 (10)	Feb 2, 1925	Springer Opera House, Columbus, Ohio, U.S.	
128	Win	92–5–14 (17)	Jimmy Delaney	NWS	10	Jan 21, 1925	Armory, Grand Rapids, Michigan, U.S.	
127	Win	92–5–14 (16)	Mike Wallace	PTS	10	Jan 14, 1925	Waterfront Park, Saint Petersburg, Florida, U.S.	
126	Draw	91–5–14 (16)	Hugh Walker	NWS	10	Jan 12, 1925	Biscayne Stadium, Miami, Florida, U.S.	
125	Win	91–5–14 (15)	Johnny Klesch	PTS	12	Dec 15, 1924	Lakeside Park Pavillion, Dayton, Ohio, U.S.	
124	Win	90–5–14 (15)	Joe Lohman	NWS	10	Dec 12, 1924	Grand Rapids, Michigan, U.S.	
123	Win	90–5–14 (14)	Harry Fay	PTS	10	Nov 27, 1924	Auditorium, Atlanta, Georgia, U.S.	
122	Win	89–5–14 (14)	Fay Keiser	KO	4 (10)	Nov 11, 1924	Textile Hall, Greenville, South Carolina, U.S.	
121	Win	88–5–14 (14)	Vic McLaughlin	NWS	10	Sep 27, 1924	Raleigh, North Carolina, U.S.	
120	Loss	88–5–14 (13)	Ad Stone	NWS	12	Sep 24, 1924	113th Regiment Armory, Newark, New Jersey, U.S.	
119	Win	88–5–14 (12)	Tommy Robson	PTS	10	Sep 16, 1924	Mechanics Building, Boston, Massachusetts, U.S.	
118	Win	87–5–14 (12)	Mike Nestor	KO	2 (12)	Sep 13, 1924	Portland, Maine, U.S.	
117	Win	86–5–14 (12)	Glenn Clickner	KO	2 (12)	Sep 9, 1924	Fairmont Arena, Columbus, Ohio, U.S.	
116	Win	85–5–14 (12)	Frankie Simms	NWS	8	Sep 5, 1924	Knoxville, Tennessee, U.S.	
115	Win	85–5–14 (11)	Irish Sizemore	KO	3 (10)	Sep 4, 1924	Asheville, North Carolina, U.S.	
114	Win	84–5–14 (11)	Young Bob Fitzsimmons	PTS	10	Sep 1, 1924	Central City Park, Macon, Georgia, U.S.	
113	Draw	83–5–14 (11)	Paul Berlenbach	PTS	6	Aug 27, 1924	Velodrome, Manhattan, New York City, New York, U.S.	
112	Win	83–5–13 (11)	Jack Stone	KO	4 (8)	Aug 18, 1924	Johnson City, Tennessee, U.S.	
111	Win	82–5–13 (11)	Leo Leonard	KO	3 (12)	Aug 12, 1924	Charleston, South Carolina, U.S.	
110	Win	81–5–13 (11)	Tommy Loughran	PTS	6	Jun 26, 1924	Yankee Stadium, Bronx, New York City, New York, U.S.	
109	Win	80–5–13 (11)	Ray Neuman	PTS	12	May 28, 1924	Nutmeg Stadium, New Haven, Connecticut, U.S.	
108	Win	79–5–13 (11)	Dan O'Dowd	PTS	10	May 20, 1924	Auditorium, Atlanta, Georgia, U.S.	
107	Win	78–5–13 (11)	Billy Conley	NWS	12	May 8, 1924	Rayen-Wood Auditorium, Youngstown, Ohio, U.S.	
106	Win	78–5–13 (10)	Tom Burns	PTS	10	May 2, 1924	Coliseum, Toronto, Quebec, Canada	
105	Win	77–5–13 (10)	Mike Burke	PTS	6	Apr 29, 1924	Madison Square Garden, Manhattan, New York City, New York, U.S.	
104	Win	76–5–13 (10)	Walter Young Rollo	KO	2 (10)	Apr 25, 1924	Norfolk, Virginia, U.S.	
103	Win	75–5–13 (10)	Tex McEwan	TKO	7 (10)	Apr 14, 1924	Arena, Philadelphia, Pennsylvania, U.S.	
102	Win	74–5–13 (10)	Gunner Joe Quinn	TKO	9 (12)	Apr 11, 1924	Armory G, Appleton, Wisconsin, U.S.	
101	Win	73–5–13 (10)	Mike McTigue	NWS	12	Mar 31, 1924	1st Regiment Armory, Newark, New Jersey, U.S.	
100	Win	73–5–13 (9)	Jack Perry	KO	2 (10)	Feb 28, 1924	Raleigh, North Carolina, U.S.	
99	Loss	72–5–13 (9)	Jimmy Slattery	PTS	6	Feb 25, 1924	Broadway Auditorium, Buffalo, New York, U.S.	
98	Win	72–4–13 (9)	Walter Ross	KO	2 (?)	Feb 15, 1924	Municipal Auditorium, Savannah, Georgia, U.S.	
97	Win	71–4–13 (9)	Jack Schoendorf	NWS	10	Feb 11, 1924	Heuck's Opera House, Cincinnati, Ohio, U.S.	
96	Win	71–4–13 (8)	Vic McLaughlin	PTS	10	Feb 4, 1924	Springer Opera House, Columbus, Georgia, U.S.	
95	Win	70–4–13 (8)	Billy Shade	PTS	10	Jan 29, 1924	Auditorium, Atlanta, Georgia, U.S.	
94	Win	69–4–13 (8)	Harry Fay	NWS	10	Jan 21, 1924	Tomlinson Hall, Indianapolis, Indiana, U.S.	
93	Loss	69–4–13 (7)	Norman Genet	DQ	6 (?)	Jan 14, 1924	West Palm Beach, Florida, U.S.	
92	Win	69–3–13 (7)	Mike Nestor	KO	5 (12)	Jan 10, 1924	Cycledrome, Miami, Florida, U.S.	
91	Win	68–3–13 (7)	Kid Numbers	KO	4 (15)	Jan 3, 1924	Fort Bragg, North Carolina, U.S.	
90	Win	67–3–13 (7)	Dave Rosenberg	NWS	12	Jan 1, 1924	1st Regiment Armory, Newark, New Jersey, U.S.	
89	Win	67–3–13 (6)	Harry Krohn	NWS	12	Dec 21, 1923	Cycledrome, Miami, Florida, U.S.	
88	Win	67–3–13 (5)	Billy McGowan	NWS	8	Dec 18, 1923	Knoxville, Tennessee, U.S.	
87	Win	67–3–13 (4)	Eddie McDonald	TKO	5 (6)	Dec 15, 1923	Johnson City, Tennessee, U.S.	
86	Win	66–3–13 (4)	Joe Eagan	PTS	10	Nov 26, 1923	Arena, Boston, Massachusetts, U.S.	
85	Win	65–3–13 (4)	Steve Choynski	KO	5 (10)	Oct 18, 1923	Municipal Auditorium, Macon, Georgia, U.S.	
84	Win	64–3–13 (4)	Tom Burns	NWS	10	Oct 15, 1923	Detroit, Michigan, U.S.	
83	Draw	64–3–13 (3)	Mike McTigue	PTS	10	Oct 4, 1923	Driving Park, Columbus, Georgia, U.S.	For NYSAC, NBA, and The Ring light-heavyweight titles
82	Win	64–3–12 (3)	Jimmy Conway	TKO	8 (10)	Sep 19, 1923	Rome, Georgia, U.S.	
81	Win	63–3–12 (3)	Sailor Martin	NWS	10	Sep 10, 1923	Cycledrome, Miami, Florida, U.S.	
80	Win	63–3–12 (2)	Happy Howard	PTS	15	Jun 25, 1923	Pierre Avenue Arena, Shreveport, Louisiana, U.S.	
79	Draw	62–3–12 (2)	Vic McLaughlin	PTS	10	Jun 18, 1923	Savannah, Georgia, U.S.	
78	Win	62–3–11 (2)	Jack McCarron	PTS	10	Jun 14, 1923	City Auditorium, Macon, Georgia, U.S.	
77	Win	61–3–11 (2)	Jimmy Darcy	PTS	10	Jun 4, 1923	Driving Park, Columbus, Georgia, U.S.	
76	Win	60–3–11 (2)	Al Nelson	KO	2 (10)	May 17, 1923	Spiller's Ballpark, Atlanta, Georgia, U.S.	
75	Win	59–3–11 (2)	Al Nelson	KO	3 (10)	May 17, 1923	Spiller's Ballpark, Atlanta, Georgia, U.S.	Won Southern middleweight title
74	Loss	58–3–11 (2)	Frank Carbone	PTS	10	May 4, 1923	Auditorium, Atlanta, Georgia, U.S.	Lost Southern middleweight title
73	Win	58–2–11 (2)	Kid Suby	TKO	7 (?)	Apr 26, 1923	Legion Hall, Augusta, Georgia, U.S.	Won vacant middleweight championship of the south
72	Draw	57–2–11 (2)	Colin (Red) McLachlin	NWS	10	Apr 23, 1923	Fair Building, Miami, Florida, U.S.	
71	Win	57–2–11 (1)	Happy Howard	PTS	10	Apr 19, 1923	Macon, Georgia, U.S.	
70	Win	56–2–11 (1)	Battling Kuhn	KO	9 (15)	Mar 29, 1923	Columbus, Georgia, U.S.	
69	Win	55–2–11 (1)	Leo Leonard	PTS	10	Mar 20, 1923	Municipal Auditorium, Savannah, Georgia, U.S.	
68	Draw	54–2–11 (1)	Jackie Clark	PTS	10	Mar 9, 1923	Auditorium, Atlanta, Georgia, U.S.	
67	Win	54–2–10 (1)	Johnny Klesch	PTS	10	Mar 1, 1923	Georgia A.C., Macon, Georgia, U.S.	
66	Win	53–2–10 (1)	Billy McGowan	PTS	10	Feb 27, 1923	Rome, Georgia, U.S.	
65	Win	52–2–10 (1)	Battling Kuhn	PTS	10	Feb 8, 1923	Macon, Georgia, U.S.	
64	Win	51–2–10 (1)	Harry Krohn	PTS	10	Jan 30, 1923	Auditorium, Atlanta, Georgia, U.S.	
63	Win	50–2–10 (1)	Tony Marullo	TKO	9 (15)	Jan 26, 1923	Tulane Arena, New Orleans, Louisiana, U.S.	
62	Win	49–2–10 (1)	George Shade	PTS	10	Jan 18, 1923	Municipal Auditorium, Macon, Georgia, U.S.	
61	Win	48–2–10 (1)	Jack Middleton	KO	1 (10)	Jan 1, 1923	Municipal Auditorium, Macon, Georgia, U.S.	
60	Win	47–2–10 (1)	Jack Denham	KO	7 (10)	Dec 29, 1922	Birmingham, Alabama, U.S.	
59	Win	46–2–10 (1)	Jack Turner	PTS	8	Dec 26, 1922	National Sanatorium, Johnson City, Tennessee, U.S.	
58	Win	45–2–10 (1)	Jimmy King	PTS	10	Dec 7, 1922	Macon, Georgia, U.S.	
57	Win	44–2–10 (1)	Billy McGowan	PTS	10	Dec 1, 1922	Quitman, Georgia, U.S.	Retained welterweight championship of the south
56	Win	43–2–10 (1)	Tony Marullo	PTS	12	Nov 18, 1922	Fronton Jai-Alai, Havana, Cuba	
55	Win	42–2–10 (1)	Jack Denham	PTS	10	Nov 9, 1922	City Auditorium, Macon, Georgia, U.S.	
54	Win	41–2–10 (1)	Tiger Toro	PTS	6	Oct 20, 1922	Sanatorium, Johnson City, Tennessee, U.S.	
53	Win	40–2–10 (1)	Young Wallace	KO	10 (10)	Oct 14, 1922	Havana, Cuba	
52	Win	39–2–10 (1)	James Red Herring	PTS	10	Oct 4, 1922	Central City Park, Macon, Georgia, U.S.	
51	Win	38–2–10 (1)	Jojo Johnson	KO	4 (10)	Sep 29, 1922	Thomasville, Georgia, U.S.	
50	Win	37–2–10 (1)	Eddie Hanlon	KO	1 (10)	Sep 14, 1922	Americus, Georgia, U.S.	
49	Draw	36–2–10 (1)	James Red Herring	PTS	10	Sep 4, 1922	Central City Park, Macon, Georgia, U.S.	Retained Southern welterweight title
48	Win	36–2–9 (1)	Battling Joe Kennedy	KO	3 (10)	Aug 17, 1922	Bainbridge, Georgia, U.S.	
47	Win	35–2–9 (1)	Kid Suby	PTS	10	Aug 9, 1922	Driving Park, Columbus, Georgia, U.S.	
46	Win	34–2–9 (1)	Jimmy Conway	PTS	10	Aug 4, 1922	Savannah, Georgia, U.S.	
45	Win	33–2–9 (1)	Jack Turner	KO	8 (10)	Jul 27, 1922	Macon, Georgia, U.S.	
44	Win	32–2–9 (1)	Jake Abel	PTS	10	Jul 4, 1922	Central City Park, Macon, Georgia, U.S.	Won welterweight championship of the south
43	Loss	31–2–9 (1)	Battling Budd	NWS	10	Jun 12, 1922	Charlotte, North Carolina, U.S.	
42	Win	31–2–9	Johnny Flynn	PTS	8	Jun 6, 1922	Chattanooga, Tennessee, U.S.	
41	Win	30–2–9	Larry Avera	PTS	10	Jun 2, 1922	Rylander Theater, Americus, Georgia, U.S.	
40	Win	29–2–9	Joe Marks	PTS	10	May 24, 1922	City Auditorium, Macon, Georgia, U.S.	
39	Draw	28–2–9	Battling Budd	PTS	10	May 18, 1922	Municipal Auditorium, Albany, Georgia, U.S.	
38	Draw	28–2–8	Battling Budd	PTS	10	May 3, 1922	City Auditorium, Macon, Georgia, U.S.	
37	Draw	28–2–7	Larry Avera	PTS	10	Apr 25, 1922	Ponce de Leon Ballpark, Atlanta, Georgia, U.S.	
36	Win	28–2–6	Battling Kelly	PTS	8	Apr 21, 1922	Armory, Nashville, Tennessee, U.S.	
35	Win	27–2–6	Terry Nelson	PTS	10	Apr 6, 1922	City Auditorium, Albany, Georgia, U.S.	
34	Loss	26–2–6	Battling Budd	PTS	10	Mar 28, 1922	Forsyth Street Arena, Atlanta, Georgia, U.S.	
33	Win	26–1–6	Spike Maloney	KO	6 (10)	Mar 23, 1922	Municipal Auditorium, Macon, Georgia, U.S.	
32	Win	25–1–6	Battling Kelly	PTS	10	Mar 13, 1922	Birmingham, Alabama, U.S.	
31	Draw	24–1–6	Larry Avera	PTS	10	Mar 7, 1922	American Legion, Atlanta, Georgia, U.S.	
30	Win	24–1–5	Sailor Blanque	PTS	10	Feb 13, 1922	Birmingham A.C., Birmingham, Alabama, U.S.	
29	Win	23–1–5	Battling Budd	PTS	10	Feb 2, 1922	City Auditorium, Macon, Georgia, U.S.	
28	Draw	22–1–5	Freddie Boorde	PTS	10	Jan 23, 1922	Birmingham, Alabama, U.S.	
27	Win	22–1–4	Jack Brady	KO	1 (10)	Jan 16, 1922	Columbia Theater, Columbia, South Carolina, U.S.	
26	Draw	21–1–4	Freddie Boorde	PTS	10	Dec 30, 1921	Columbus A.C., Columbus, Georgia, U.S.	Retained Southern featherweight title
25	Draw	21–1–3	Battling Budd	PTS	10	Dec 26, 1921	Municipal Auditorium, Atlanta, Georgia, U.S.	
24	Win	21–1–2	Freddie Boorde	PTS	10	Dec 19, 1921	City Auditorium, Macon, Georgia, U.S.	
23	Win	20–1–2	Fearless Ferns	PTS	10	Dec 5, 1921	Auditorium, Atlanta, Georgia, U.S.	Won vacant USA Georgia State lightweight title
22	Win	19–1–2	Dick Leonard	PTS	10	Nov 29, 1921	Municipal Auditorium, Savannah, Georgia, U.S.	
21	Draw	18–1–2	Freddie Boorde	PTS	10	Nov 9, 1921	Columbus A.C., Columbus, Georgia, U.S.	Retained Southern featherweight title
20	Win	18–1–1	Joe Metranga	PTS	10	Oct 25, 1921	Auditorium, Atlanta, Georgia, U.S.	
19	Win	17–1–1	Rabbit Palmer	PTS	10	Oct 10, 1921	City Auditorium, Macon, Georgia, U.S.	
18	Win	16–1–1	Red Keenan	KO	5 (10)	Sep 29, 1921	Springer Opera House, Columbus, Georgia, U.S.	
17	Draw	15–1–1	Fearless Ferns	PTS	10	Sep 5, 1921	Central City Park, Macon, Georgia, U.S.	
16	Win	15–1	Freddie Boorde	PTS	10	Aug 15, 1921	Auditorium, Atlanta, Georgia, U.S.	Retained Southern featherweight title
15	Win	14–1	Joe Peck	PTS	10	Aug 4, 1921	Central City Park, Macon, Georgia, U.S.	
14	Win	13–1	Kid Young	KO	8 (10)	Jul 12, 1921	Business Men's A.C., Atlanta, Georgia, U.S.	
13	Win	12–1	Kid Bartlett	TKO	9 (10)	Jul 4, 1921	Central City Park, Macon, Georgia, U.S.	
12	Win	11–1	Jim Waites	KO	3 (10)	Jun 23, 1921	City Auditorium, Macon, Georgia, U.S.	
11	Win	10–1	Duette Allred	KO	2 (10)	Jun 13, 1921	Business Men's A.C., Atlanta, Georgia, U.S.	
10	Win	9–1	Dick Leonard	PTS	10	Jun 7, 1921	Business Men's A.C., Atlanta, Georgia, U.S.	
9	Win	8–1	Dick Leonard	PTS	10	May 26, 1921	City Auditorium, Macon, Georgia, U.S.	Won vacant USA Georgia State featherweight title
8	Win	7–1	Lou Gomez	KO	3 (10)	May 5, 1921	City Auditorium, Macon, Georgia, U.S.	
7	Win	6–1	Battling Mishound	PTS	10	Apr 5, 1921	Auditorium, Atlanta, Georgia, U.S.	
6	Loss	5–1	Dick Leonard	PTS	8	Mar 30, 1921	Auditorium, Savannah, Georgia, U.S.	
5	Win	5–0	Benny Harvey	PTS	10	Mar 22, 1921	Auditorium, Atlanta, Georgia, U.S.	
4	Win	4–0	Kid Sullivan	KO	1 (6)	Feb 18, 1921	Auditorium, Opera House, Milledgeville, Georgia, U.S.	
3	Win	3–0	Tim O'Dowd	KO	1 (6)	Feb 15, 1921	Auditorium, Atlanta, Georgia, U.S.	
2	Win	2–0	Johnny Kid Nappie	PTS	4	Feb 9, 1921	Auditorium, Atlanta, Georgia, U.S.	
1	Win	1–0	Billy Kid Dombe	PTS	4	Jan 17, 1921	Auditorium, Atlanta, Georgia, U.S.	

=== Unofficial record ===
291 fights	256 wins	16 losses
By knockout	129	1
By decision	125	11
By disqualification	2	4
Draws	17	
No contests	2	

Record with the inclusion of newspaper decisions in the win/loss/draw column.

No.	Result	Record	Opponent	Type	Round	Date	Location	Notes
291	Win	256–16–17 (2)	Maxie Rosenbloom	UD	10	Sep 22, 1933	Sam Houston Hall, Houston, Texas, U.S.	
290	Win	255–16–17 (2)	Benny O'Dell	TKO	2 (10)	Aug 29, 1933	Baseball Park, Lindale, Georgia, U.S.	
289	Win	254–16–17 (2)	George Neron	PTS	10	Aug 2, 1933	R.M.I. Park, Beckley, West Virginia, U.S.	
288	Loss	253–16–17 (2)	Pierre Charles	DQ	8 (10)	Mar 6, 1933	Palais des Sports, Paris, Paris, France	
287	Win	253–15–17 (2)	Don McCorkindale	PTS	12	Dec 17, 1932	Ellis Park Rugby Stadium, Johannesburg, Gauteng, South Africa	
286	Win	252–15–17 (2)	George Thompson	KO	6 (12)	Nov 7, 1932	His Majesty's Theatre, Perth, Western Australia, Australia	
285	Win	251–15–17 (2)	Tony Gora	TKO	6 (12)	Nov 3, 1932	Exhibition Building, Adelaide, South Australia, Australia	
284	NC	250–15–17 (2)	Johnny Freeman	NC	8 (12)	Oct 29, 1932	Sydney Stadium, Sydney, New South Wales, Australia	The bout was declared a no contest after both boxers "continued to engage in hostilities after the bell" ending the 8th round
283	Win	250–15–17 (1)	Johnny Freeman	PTS	15	Sep 22, 1932	West Melbourne Stadium, Melbourne, Victoria, Australia	
282	Win	249–15–17 (1)	Jack Renault	RTD	5 (15)	Aug 10, 1932	Brisbane Stadium, Brisbane, Queensland, Australia	
281	Win	248–15–17 (1)	Frankie Wine	PTS	15	Jul 25, 1932	Sydney Stadium, Sydney, New South Wales, Australia	
280	Win	247–15–17 (1)	Ambrose Palmer	TKO	10 (15)	Jul 4, 1932	Sydney Stadium, Sydney, New South Wales, Australia	
279	Win	246–15–17 (1)	Johnny Freeman	NWS	10	May 30, 1932	Huntsville, Alabama, U.S.	
278	Win	245–15–17 (1)	Big Sid Terris	KO	5 (10)	May 23, 1932	Winston-Salem, North Carolina, U.S.	
277	Win	244–15–17 (1)	Joe Doctor	PTS	10	May 16, 1932	Toronto, Ontario, Canada	Doctor disqualified for "stalling"
276	Win	243–15–17 (1)	George Neron	PTS	10	May 10, 1932	Central Tobacco Warehouse, Johnson City, Tennessee, U.S.	
275	Loss	242–15–17 (1)	Ernie Schaaf	PTS	10	Feb 26, 1932	Chicago Stadium, Chicago, Illinois, U.S.	
274	Win	242–14–17 (1)	Pietro Corri	NWS	10	Nov 23, 1931	Birmingham, Alabama, U.S.	
273	Win	241–14–17 (1)	Pat Fay	KO	3 (10)	Nov 11, 1931	Muskogee, Oklahoma, U.S.	
272	Win	240–14–17 (1)	Red Fitzsimmons	TKO	4 (10)	Nov 3, 1931	Shrine Mosque, Springfield, Missouri, U.S.	
271	Win	239–14–17 (1)	Salvatore Ruggirello	KO	2 (10)	Oct 19, 1931	Forum, Wichita, Kansas, U.S.	
270	Loss	238–14–17 (1)	Max Schmeling	TKO	15 (15)	Jul 3, 1931	Municipal Stadium, Cleveland, Ohio, U.S.	For NBA and The Ring heavyweight titles
269	Win	238–13–17 (1)	Tuffy Griffiths	UD	10	Dec 12, 1930	Chicago Stadium, Chicago, Illinois, U.S.	
268	Win	237–13–17 (1)	Whitey Gorsline	TKO	3 (10)	Nov 19, 1930	Grand Rapids, Michigan, U.S.	
267	Win	236–13–17 (1)	Arthur De Kuh	PTS	10	Nov 11, 1930	Spiller's Ballpark, Atlanta, Georgia, U.S.	
266	Win	235–13–17 (1)	KO Christner	TKO	3 (10)	Oct 31, 1930	Arena, Boston, Massachusetts, U.S.	
265	Win	234–13–17 (1)	Phil Scott	KO	2 (15)	Jul 28, 1930	Wimbledon Stadium, Wimbledon, London, England, U.K.	
264	Win	233–13–17 (1)	Otto von Porat	KO	1 (10)	Jun 20, 1930	Chicago Stadium, Chicago, Illinois, U.S.	
263	Win	232–13–17 (1)	Frankie Wine	NWS	6	Jun 5, 1930	Birmingham, Alabama, U.S.	
262	Win	231–13–17 (1)	Hans Schönrath	TKO	2 (10)	May 8, 1930	Royal Albert Hall, Kensington, London, England, U.K.	
261	Win	230–13–17 (1)	Pietro Corri	PTS	10	Feb 21, 1930	Benjamin Field Arena, Tampa, Florida, U.S.	
260	Win	229–13–17 (1)	Joe Packo	KO	8 (10)	Feb 17, 1930	Coliseum Arena, New Orleans, Louisiana, U.S.	
259	Win	228–13–17 (1)	Jack DeMave	KO	1 (10)	Jan 22, 1930	Auditorium, Atlanta, Georgia, U.S.	
258	Win	227–13–17 (1)	Primo Carnera	DQ	7 (10)	Dec 7, 1929	Velodrome d'Hiver, Paris, Paris, France	Carnera struck Stribling from behind after the bell ended the seventh round. The bout was probably fixed
257	Loss	226–13–17 (1)	Primo Carnera	DQ	4 (15)	Nov 18, 1929	Royal Albert Hall, Kensington, London, England, U.K.	Both fighters down in the third. Carnera down from low blow in 4th. This bout was probably fixed
256	Win	226–12–17 (1)	Maurice Griselle	PTS	10	Nov 6, 1929	Cirque de Paris, Paris, Paris, France	
255	Win	225–12–17 (1)	Johnny Gibson	KO	3 (10)	Sep 24, 1929	Tobacco Warehouse, Cairo, Georgia, U.S.	
254	Win	224–12–17 (1)	George Cook	TKO	8 (10)	Sep 2, 1929	Municipal Auditorium, Macon, Georgia, U.S.	
253	Win	223–12–17 (1)	Joe Packo	NWS	10	Aug 30, 1929	Coliseum, Evansville, Indiana, U.S.	
252	Win	222–12–17 (1)	Frankie Wine	PTS	8	Aug 29, 1929	Sulphur Dell, Nashville, Tennessee, U.S.	
251	Win	221–12–17 (1)	Joe Sekyra	NWS	10	Aug 19, 1929	Convention Hall, Kansas City, Missouri, U.S.	
250	Win	220–12–17 (1)	Harry Fay	KO	5 (10)	Aug 12, 1929	Little Rock, Arkansas, U.S.	
249	Loss	219–12–17 (1)	Babe Hunt	DQ	6 (10)	Jul 29, 1929	McNulty Park, Tulsa, Oklahoma, U.S.	A right hand punch to the groin disqualified Stribling
248	Win	219–11–17 (1)	George Cook	NWS	10	Jul 18, 1929	Muehlebach Field, Kansas City, Missouri, U.S.	
247	Win	218–11–17 (1)	Jack DeMave	PTS	8	Jul 11, 1929	Sterchi Park Arena, Knoxville, Tennessee, U.S.	
246	Win	217–11–17 (1)	Tony Fuente	KO	2 (10)	Jul 4, 1929	City Auditorium, Birmingham, Alabama, U.S.	
245	Win	216–11–17 (1)	Jack Lee	KO	8 (10)	Jun 24, 1929	Flint, Michigan, U.S.	
244	Win	215–11–17 (1)	Babe Hunt	NWS	10	Jun 17, 1929	Forum, Wichita, Kansas, U.S.	
243	Loss	214–11–17 (1)	Jack Sharkey	PTS	10	Feb 27, 1929	Flamingo Park, Miami Beach, Florida, U.S.	
242	Win	214–10–17 (1)	Ralph Smith	TKO	3 (10)	Jan 25, 1929	Coliseum Arena, New Orleans, Louisiana, U.S.	
241	Win	213–10–17 (1)	Sully Montgomery	KO	2 (8)	Jan 21, 1929	Memphis, Tennessee, U.S.	
240	Win	212–10–17 (1)	Art Malay	KO	3 (10)	Jan 18, 1929	Norfolk, Virginia, U.S.	
239	Win	211–10–17 (1)	Tommy Stone	KO	2 (10)	Jan 9, 1929	Durham, North Carolina, U.S.	
238	Win	210–10–17 (1)	Jack League	KO	1 (10)	Jan 1, 1929	Kansas City, Missouri, U.S.	
237	Win	209–10–17 (1)	Jack Blackstock	KO	2 (10)	Dec 21, 1928	Imperial Theatre, Augusta, Georgia, U.S.	
236	Win	208–10–17 (1)	Andres Castano	KO	2 (10)	Dec 20, 1928	Macon, Georgia, U.S.	
235	Win	207–10–17 (1)	Billy Freas	TKO	1 (10)	Dec 18, 1928	Coliseum, Saint Louis, Missouri, U.S.	
234	Win	206–10–17 (1)	Ray Neuman	KO	6 (10)	Nov 30, 1928	Auditorium, Charlotte, North Carolina, U.S.	
233	Win	205–10–17 (1)	Big Sid Terris	KO	3 (10)	Oct 30, 1928	Auditorium, Atlanta, Georgia, U.S.	
232	Win	204–10–17 (1)	Frankie Wine	NWS	10	Sep 20, 1928	Grand Rapids, Michigan, U.S.	
231	Win	203–10–17 (1)	Johnny Squires	TKO	2 (10)	Sep 6, 1928	Madison Square Garden, Manhattan, New York City, New York, U.S.	
230	Win	202–10–17 (1)	Martin Burke	TKO	1 (10)	Aug 13, 1928	Mobile, Alabama, U.S.	
229	Win	201–10–17 (1)	Jack Van Ryan	KO	2 (10)	Aug 6, 1928	Wilmington, North Carolina, U.S.	
228	Win	200–10–17 (1)	Bill Jordan	KO	1 (10)	Jul 24, 1928	High Point, North Carolina, U.S.	
227	Win	199–10–17 (1)	Tom Kirby	PTS	10	Jul 20, 1928	Englewood Celtic Park, Chicago, Illinois, U.S.	
226	Win	198–10–17 (1)	Bucky Harris	KO	3 (10)	Jul 4, 1928	Macon, Georgia, U.S.	
225	Win	197–10–17 (1)	Wild Bill Rowe	KO	2 (?)	Jul 2, 1928	Burgoyne Isle, Daytona Beach, Florida, U.S.	
224	Win	196–10–17 (1)	Joe Packo	KO	7 (10)	Jun 12, 1928	Cramton Bowl, Montgomery, Alabama, U.S.	
223	Win	195–10–17 (1)	Harry Fay	PTS	10	Jun 7, 1928	Jacksonville, Florida, U.S.	
222	Win	194–10–17 (1)	Ted Cook	KO	3 (10)	Jun 5, 1928	Meridian, Mississippi, U.S.	
221	Win	193–10–17 (1)	Joe King	KO	2 (10)	Jun 1, 1928	Meridian, Mississippi, U.S.	
220	Win	192–10–17 (1)	Johnny Urban	TKO	5 (8)	May 30, 1928	Chattanooga, Tennessee, U.S.	
219	Win	191–10–17 (1)	Tommy Stone	KO	1 (10)	May 25, 1928	Albany, New York, U.S.	
218	Win	190–10–17 (1)	Charley Rammell	KO	2 (?)	May 22, 1928	Pensacola, Florida, U.S.	
217	Win	189–10–17 (1)	Marcello Gubinelli	KO	1 (10)	May 18, 1928	Benjamin Field Arena, Tampa, Florida, U.S.	
216	Win	188–10–17 (1)	Pete Ankelos	KO	2 (10)	May 9, 1928	Tinker Field, Orlando, Florida, U.S.	
215	Win	187–10–17 (1)	Andres Castano	KO	2 (10)	May 8, 1928	Legion Arena, West Palm Beach, Florida, U.S.	
214	Win	186–10–17 (1)	Russ Rowsey	TKO	2 (10)	Apr 30, 1928	Coliseum, Coral Gables, Florida, U.S.	
213	Win	185–10–17 (1)	Joe White	KO	2 (?)	Apr 23, 1928	Chattanooga, Tennessee, U.S.	
212	Win	184–10–17 (1)	Italian Jack Herman	KO	2 (10)	Apr 17, 1928	Jacksonville, Florida, U.S.	
211	Win	183–10–17 (1)	George Gemas	KO	3 (?)	Apr 11, 1928	Goldsboro, North Carolina, U.S.	
210	Win	182–10–17 (1)	Jack Blackstock	KO	2 (10)	Apr 2, 1928	Legion Coliseum, Sarasota, Florida, U.S.	
209	Win	181–10–17 (1)	Earl Blue	TKO	2 (10)	Mar 30, 1928	Benjamin Field Arena, Tampa, Florida, U.S.	
208	Win	180–10–17 (1)	Pat Joyce	KO	1 (10)	Mar 16, 1928	New Baseball Stadium, Augusta, Georgia, U.S.	
207	Win	179–10–17 (1)	George Avera	KO	2 (10)	Mar 12, 1928	Dothan, Alabama, U.S.	
206	Win	178–10–17 (1)	Chuck Wiggins	PTS	12	Mar 6, 1928	Public Hall, Cleveland, Ohio, U.S.	
205	Win	177–10–17 (1)	Al Friedman	KO	2 (10)	Feb 27, 1928	Coliseum, Coral Gables, Florida, U.S.	
204	Win	176–10–17 (1)	Joe Clancy	KO	2 (10)	Feb 23, 1928	Montgomery, Alabama, U.S.	
203	Win	175–10–17 (1)	Tom Maxted	KO	2 (10)	Feb 7, 1928	Jacksonville, Florida, U.S.	
202	Win	174–10–17 (1)	Marine Tolliver	KO	2 (?)	Feb 6, 1928	Birmingham, Alabama, U.S.	
201	Win	173–10–17 (1)	Chuck Burns	PTS	10	Jan 30, 1928	Tulsa, Oklahoma, U.S.	
200	Win	172–10–17 (1)	Martin Burke	KO	1 (10)	Jan 23, 1928	Coliseum, Coral Gables, Florida, U.S.	
199	Win	171–10–17 (1)	Chuck Wiggins	NWS	10	Jan 9, 1928	Forum, Wichita, Kansas, U.S.	
198	Win	170–10–17 (1)	Tom Kirby	UD	10	Dec 15, 1927	South Main Street Armory, Wilkes-Barre, Pennsylvania, U.S.	
197	Win	169–10–17 (1)	Lou Scozza	PTS	10	Dec 9, 1927	Broadway Auditorium, Buffalo, New York, U.S.	
196	Win	168–10–17 (1)	Andy Kid Palmer	TKO	6 (10)	Nov 21, 1927	Valdosta, Georgia, U.S.	
195	Win	167–10–17 (1)	Angus Snyder	PTS	6	Nov 8, 1927	Arena, Dishman, Washington, U.S.	
194	Win	166–10–17 (1)	Harry Dillon	PTS	10	Nov 4, 1927	Ice Coliseum, Portland, Oregon, U.S.	
193	Win	165–10–17 (1)	Mike Arnold	KO	4 (10)	Oct 28, 1927	Wichita, Kansas, U.S.	
192	NC	164–10–17 (1)	Leo Deibel	NC	6 (10)	Sep 6, 1927	Auditorium, Omaha, Nebraska, U.S.	Diebel and Stribling were arrested by Inspector of Detectives, Ben Banbaum on charges of participating in a sham/framed fight
191	Win	164–10–17	Ed Smith	KO	3 (?)	Aug 29, 1927	Tulsa, Oklahoma, U.S.	
190	Draw	163–10–17	Chuck Wiggins	NWS	10	Aug 25, 1927	Washington Park, Indianapolis, Indiana, U.S.	
189	Win	163–10–16	Otto von Porat	NWS	10	Jul 21, 1927	Municipal Auditorium, Minneapolis, Minnesota, U.S.	
188	Win	162–10–16	Chuck Wiggins	DQ	6 (10)	Jul 4, 1927	Macon, Georgia, U.S.	
187	Win	161–10–16	Tiny Jim Herman	PTS	10	May 19, 1927	Golden Park, Columbus, Ohio, U.S.	
186	Win	160–10–16	Jimmy Byrne	NWS	12	May 13, 1927	Jefferson County Armory, Louisville, Kentucky, U.S.	
185	Loss	159–10–16	Tommy Loughran	UD	10	May 3, 1927	Ebbets Field, Brooklyn, New York City, New York, U.S.	
184	Win	159–9–16	Benny Ross	PTS	10	Apr 18, 1927	Broadway Auditorium, Buffalo, New York, U.S.	
183	Win	158–9–16	Jack Melrose	KO	2 (8)	Apr 7, 1927	Memphis, Tennessee, U.S.	
182	Win	157–9–16	Red Fitzsimmons	TKO	4 (10)	Apr 4, 1927	Canton Auditorium, Canton, Ohio, U.S.	
181	Win	156–9–16	Art Weigand	TKO	7 (10)	Mar 23, 1927	Broadway Auditorium, Buffalo, New York, U.S.	
180	Win	155–9–16	Maxie Rosenbloom	PTS	10	Mar 17, 1927	Mechanics Building, Boston, Massachusetts, U.S.	
179	Win	154–9–16	Eddie Civil	KO	2 (10)	Mar 10, 1927	Macon, Georgia, U.S.	
178	Win	153–9–16	Leo Gates	TKO	5 (10)	Mar 3, 1927	Auditorium, Atlanta, Georgia, U.S.	
177	Win	152–9–16	Eddie Huffman	PTS	10	Feb 7, 1927	Madison Square Garden, Manhattan, New York City, New York, U.S.	
176	Win	151–9–16	Joe Lohman	KO	7 (10)	Dec 20, 1926	Macon, Georgia, U.S.	
175	Win	150–9–16	Big Boy Peterson	TKO	5 (10)	Nov 26, 1926	Benjamin Field Arena, Tampa, Florida, U.S.	
174	Win	149–9–16	Ed Smith	PTS	10	Nov 18, 1926	Miami Field, Miami, Florida, U.S.	
173	Win	148–9–16	Battling Levinsky	NWS	10	Nov 11, 1926	Coliseum, Des Moines, Iowa, U.S.	
172	Win	147–9–16	Soldier Buck	KO	4 (12)	Oct 18, 1926	Jefferson County Armory, Louisville, Kentucky, U.S.	
171	Win	146–9–16	Lou Rollinger	TKO	3 (10)	Oct 15, 1926	Cattle Congress Hippodrome, Waterloo, Iowa, U.S.	
170	Win	145–9–16	Frankie Bush	TKO	6 (8)	Sep 30, 1926	Memphis, Tennessee, U.S.	This bout may have taken place on September 29, 1926
169	Win	144–9–16	Chuck Burns	PTS	10	Sep 21, 1926	Auditorium, Atlanta, Georgia, U.S.	
168	Win	143–9–16	Buck Aston	TKO	9 (10)	Sep 17, 1926	Benjamin Field Arena, Tampa, Florida, U.S.	
167	Loss	142–9–16	Paul Berlenbach	UD	15	Jun 10, 1926	Yankee Stadium, Bronx, New York City, New York, U.S.	For NYSAC, NBA, and The Ring light-heavyweight titles
166	Win	142–8–16	Ray Neuman	PTS	10	May 24, 1926	Auditorium, Atlanta, Georgia, U.S.	
165	Win	141–8–16	Johnny Risko	PTS	10	May 14, 1926	Madison Square Garden, Manhattan, New York City, New York, U.S.	
164	Win	140–8–16	Mike Wallace	KO	3 (8)	Apr 26, 1926	Stadium, Memphis, Tennessee, U.S.	
163	Win	139–8–16	Billy Britton	KO	3 (10)	Apr 25, 1926	Topeka, Kansas, U.S.	
162	Win	138–8–16	Joe Lohman	NWS	10	Apr 20, 1926	Kansas City, Kansas, U.S.	
161	Win	137–8–16	Tommy Marvin	KO	3 (10)	Apr 13, 1926	Oklahoma City, Oklahoma, U.S.	
160	Win	136–8–16	Chuck Burns	NWS	10	Apr 12, 1926	Forum, Wichita, Kansas, U.S.	
159	Win	135–8–16	Jimmy Slattery	PTS	10	Mar 25, 1926	Madison Square Garden, Manhattan, New York City, New York, U.S.	
158	Win	134–8–16	Tom Burns	NWS	10	Dec 4, 1925	Grand Rapids, Michigan, U.S.	
157	Win	133–8–16	Billy Britton	TKO	1 (15)	Nov 27, 1925	Coliseum Arena, New Orleans, Louisiana, U.S.	
156	Win	132–8–16	George Cook	PTS	10	Nov 7, 1925	Municipal Stadium, Columbus, Georgia, U.S.	
155	Win	131–8–16	Soldier Buck	KO	3 (8)	Nov 2, 1925	Memphis, Tennessee, U.S.	
154	Win	130–8–16	Tom McKiernan	KO	2 (10)	Oct 22, 1925	State Fair Grounds, Columbia, South Carolina, U.S.	
153	Win	129–8–16	Eddie Huffman	PTS	10	Oct 10, 1925	Ascot Park, Los Angeles, California, U.S.	
152	Win	128–8–16	Peck Warren	KO	6 (10)	Aug 31, 1925	Dallas, Texas, U.S.	
151	Win	127–8–16	Jack League	KO	4 (12)	Aug 27, 1925	Fort Sam Houston, San Antonio, Texas, U.S.	
150	Win	126–8–16	Red Fitzsimmons	KO	3 (12)	Aug 25, 1925	Fort Bliss Arena, El Paso, Texas, U.S.	
149	Win	125–8–16	Sergeant Jack Lynch	TKO	9 (10)	Aug 21, 1925	Capital City Arena, Phoenix, Arizona, U.S.	
148	Win	124–8–16	Jimmy Delaney	PTS	10	Aug 18, 1925	Arena, Vernon, California, U.S.	
147	Win	123–8–16	Johnny Lee	KO	2 (10)	Aug 4, 1925	Salt Lake City, Utah, U.S.	
146	Win	122–8–16	Harvey Perkins	PTS	10	Jul 28, 1925	Colorado Springs, Colorado, U.S.	
145	Win	121–8–16	Jack Matlock	TKO	3 (10)	Jul 17, 1925	Wichita, Kansas, U.S.	
144	Win	120–8–16	Billy Freas	KO	7 (10)	Jul 9, 1925	Grand Rapids, Michigan, U.S.	
143	Win	119–8–16	Johnny Risko	NWS	10	Jul 2, 1925	East Chicago, Indiana, U.S.	
142	Win	118–8–16	Bud Gorman	MD	10	Jun 29, 1925	Arena Gardens, Detroit, Michigan, U.S.	
141	Win	117–8–16	George Cook	PTS	10	Jun 15, 1925	Mechanics Building, Boston, Massachusetts, U.S.	
140	Win	116–8–16	Frankie Simms	KO	3 (12)	Jun 8, 1925	Carlin's Park, Baltimore, Maryland, U.S.	
139	Win	115–8–16	Buck Brady	KO	3 (10)	Jun 2, 1925	Grand Theater, Greensboro, North Carolina, U.S.	
138	Win	114–8–16	Chief Metoquah	NWS	10	May 25, 1925	Convention Hall, Hutchinson, Kansas, U.S.	
137	Win	113–8–16	Hugh Walker	NWS	10	May 19, 1925	Kansas City, Missouri, U.S.	
136	Win	112–8–16	Quintin Romero Rojas	TKO	4 (10)	May 7, 1925	Mechanics Building, Boston, Massachusetts, U.S.	
135	Win	111–8–16	Hugh Walker	PTS	10	Apr 7, 1925	Warren Park, Augusta, Georgia, U.S.	
134	Win	110–8–16	Tommy Loughran	PTS	10	Mar 28, 1925	Recreation Park, San Francisco, California, U.S.	
133	Win	109–8–16	Harry Fay	PTS	10	Mar 9, 1925	Motor Square Garden, Pittsburgh, Pennsylvania, U.S.	
132	Win	108–8–16	Dan O'Dowd	NWS	10	Mar 3, 1925	Kalamazoo, Michigan, U.S.	
131	Loss	107–8–16	Jimmy Delaney	NWS	10	Feb 27, 1925	Auditorium, Milwaukee, Wisconsin, U.S.	
130	Win	107–7–16	Ted Jamieson	KO	6 (10)	Feb 20, 1925	Savannah, Georgia, U.S.	
129	Win	106–7–16	Joe Burke	KO	3 (10)	Feb 2, 1925	Springer Opera House, Columbus, Ohio, U.S.	
128	Win	105–7–16	Jimmy Delaney	NWS	10	Jan 21, 1925	Armory, Grand Rapids, Michigan, U.S.	
127	Win	104–7–16	Mike Wallace	PTS	10	Jan 14, 1925	Waterfront Park, Saint Petersburg, Florida, U.S.	
126	Draw	103–7–16	Hugh Walker	NWS	10	Jan 12, 1925	Biscayne Stadium, Miami, Florida, U.S.	
125	Win	103–7–15	Johnny Klesch	PTS	12	Dec 15, 1924	Lakeside Park Pavillion, Dayton, Ohio, U.S.	
124	Win	102–7–15	Joe Lohman	NWS	10	Dec 12, 1924	Grand Rapids, Michigan, U.S.	
123	Win	101–7–15	Harry Fay	PTS	10	Nov 27, 1924	Auditorium, Atlanta, Georgia, U.S.	
122	Win	100–7–15	Fay Keiser	KO	4 (10)	Nov 11, 1924	Textile Hall, Greenville, South Carolina, U.S.	
121	Win	99–7–15	Vic McLaughlin	NWS	10	Sep 27, 1924	Raleigh, North Carolina, U.S.	
120	Loss	98–7–15	Ad Stone	NWS	12	Sep 24, 1924	113th Regiment Armory, Newark, New Jersey, U.S.	
119	Win	98–6–15	Tommy Robson	PTS	10	Sep 16, 1924	Mechanics Building, Boston, Massachusetts, U.S.	
118	Win	97–6–15	Mike Nestor	KO	2 (12)	Sep 13, 1924	Portland, Maine, U.S.	
117	Win	96–6–15	Glenn Clickner	KO	2 (12)	Sep 9, 1924	Fairmont Arena, Columbus, Ohio, U.S.	
116	Win	95–6–15	Frankie Simms	NWS	8	Sep 5, 1924	Knoxville, Tennessee, U.S.	
115	Win	94–6–15	Irish Sizemore	KO	3 (10)	Sep 4, 1924	Asheville, North Carolina, U.S.	
114	Win	93–6–15	Young Bob Fitzsimmons	PTS	10	Sep 1, 1924	Central City Park, Macon, Georgia, U.S.	
113	Draw	92–6–15	Paul Berlenbach	PTS	6	Aug 27, 1924	Velodrome, Manhattan, New York City, New York, U.S.	
112	Win	92–6–14	Jack Stone	KO	4 (8)	Aug 18, 1924	Johnson City, Tennessee, U.S.	
111	Win	91–6–14	Leo Leonard	KO	3 (12)	Aug 12, 1924	Charleston, South Carolina, U.S.	
110	Win	90–6–14	Tommy Loughran	PTS	6	Jun 26, 1924	Yankee Stadium, Bronx, New York City, New York, U.S.	
109	Win	89–6–14	Ray Neuman	PTS	12	May 28, 1924	Nutmeg Stadium, New Haven, Connecticut, U.S.	
108	Win	88–6–14	Dan O'Dowd	PTS	10	May 20, 1924	Auditorium, Atlanta, Georgia, U.S.	
107	Win	87–6–14	Billy Conley	NWS	12	May 8, 1924	Rayen-Wood Auditorium, Youngstown, Ohio, U.S.	
106	Win	86–6–14	Tom Burns	PTS	10	May 2, 1924	Coliseum, Toronto, Quebec, Canada	
105	Win	85–6–14	Mike Burke	PTS	6	Apr 29, 1924	Madison Square Garden, Manhattan, New York City, New York, U.S.	
104	Win	84–6–14	Walter Young Rollo	KO	2 (10)	Apr 25, 1924	Norfolk, Virginia, U.S.	
103	Win	83–6–14	Tex McEwan	TKO	7 (10)	Apr 14, 1924	Arena, Philadelphia, Pennsylvania, U.S.	
102	Win	82–6–14	Gunner Joe Quinn	TKO	9 (12)	Apr 11, 1924	Armory G, Appleton, Wisconsin, U.S.	
101	Win	81–6–14	Mike McTigue	NWS	12	Mar 31, 1924	1st Regiment Armory, Newark, New Jersey, U.S.	
100	Win	80–6–14	Jack Perry	KO	2 (10)	Feb 28, 1924	Raleigh, North Carolina, U.S.	
99	Loss	79–6–14	Jimmy Slattery	PTS	6	Feb 25, 1924	Broadway Auditorium, Buffalo, New York, U.S.	
98	Win	79–5–14	Walter Ross	KO	2 (?)	Feb 15, 1924	Municipal Auditorium, Savannah, Georgia, U.S.	
97	Win	78–5–14	Jack Schoendorf	NWS	10	Feb 11, 1924	Heuck's Opera House, Cincinnati, Ohio, U.S.	
96	Win	77–5–14	Vic McLaughlin	PTS	10	Feb 4, 1924	Springer Opera House, Columbus, Georgia, U.S.	
95	Win	76–5–14	Billy Shade	PTS	10	Jan 29, 1924	Auditorium, Atlanta, Georgia, U.S.	
94	Win	75–5–14	Harry Fay	NWS	10	Jan 21, 1924	Tomlinson Hall, Indianapolis, Indiana, U.S.	
93	Loss	74–5–14	Norman Genet	DQ	6 (?)	Jan 14, 1924	West Palm Beach, Florida, U.S.	
92	Win	74–4–14	Mike Nestor	KO	5 (12)	Jan 10, 1924	Cycledrome, Miami, Florida, U.S.	
91	Win	73–4–14	Kid Numbers	KO	4 (15)	Jan 3, 1924	Fort Bragg, North Carolina, U.S.	
90	Win	72–4–14	Dave Rosenberg	NWS	12	Jan 1, 1924	1st Regiment Armory, Newark, New Jersey, U.S.	
89	Win	71–4–14	Harry Krohn	NWS	12	Dec 21, 1923	Cycledrome, Miami, Florida, U.S.	
88	Win	70–4–14	Billy McGowan	NWS	8	Dec 18, 1923	Knoxville, Tennessee, U.S.	
87	Win	69–4–14	Eddie McDonald	TKO	5 (6)	Dec 15, 1923	Johnson City, Tennessee, U.S.	
86	Win	68–4–14	Joe Eagan	PTS	10	Nov 26, 1923	Arena, Boston, Massachusetts, U.S.	
85	Win	67–4–14	Steve Choynski	KO	5 (10)	Oct 18, 1923	Municipal Auditorium, Macon, Georgia, U.S.	
84	Win	66–4–14	Tom Burns	NWS	10	Oct 15, 1923	Detroit, Michigan, U.S.	
83	Draw	65–4–14	Mike McTigue	PTS	10	Oct 4, 1923	Driving Park, Columbus, Georgia, U.S.	For NYSAC, NBA, and The Ring light-heavyweight titles
82	Win	65–4–13	Jimmy Conway	TKO	8 (10)	Sep 19, 1923	Rome, Georgia, U.S.	
81	Win	64–4–13	Sailor Martin	NWS	10	Sep 10, 1923	Cycledrome, Miami, Florida, U.S.	
80	Win	63–4–13	Happy Howard	PTS	15	Jun 25, 1923	Pierre Avenue Arena, Shreveport, Louisiana, U.S.	
79	Draw	62–4–13	Vic McLaughlin	PTS	10	Jun 18, 1923	Savannah, Georgia, U.S.	
78	Win	62–4–12	Jack McCarron	PTS	10	Jun 14, 1923	City Auditorium, Macon, Georgia, U.S.	
77	Win	61–4–12	Jimmy Darcy	PTS	10	Jun 4, 1923	Driving Park, Columbus, Georgia, U.S.	
76	Win	60–4–12	Al Nelson	KO	2 (10)	May 17, 1923	Spiller's Ballpark, Atlanta, Georgia, U.S.	
75	Win	59–4–12	Al Nelson	KO	3 (10)	May 17, 1923	Spiller's Ballpark, Atlanta, Georgia, U.S.	Won Southern middleweight title
74	Loss	58–4–12	Frank Carbone	PTS	10	May 4, 1923	Auditorium, Atlanta, Georgia, U.S.	Lost Southern middleweight title
73	Win	58–3–12	Kid Suby	TKO	7 (?)	Apr 26, 1923	Legion Hall, Augusta, Georgia, U.S.	Won vacant middleweight championship of the south
72	Draw	57–3–12	Colin (Red) McLachlin	NWS	10	Apr 23, 1923	Fair Building, Miami, Florida, U.S.	
71	Win	57–3–11	Happy Howard	PTS	10	Apr 19, 1923	Macon, Georgia, U.S.	
70	Win	56–3–11	Battling Kuhn	KO	9 (15)	Mar 29, 1923	Columbus, Georgia, U.S.	
69	Win	55–3–11	Leo Leonard	PTS	10	Mar 20, 1923	Municipal Auditorium, Savannah, Georgia, U.S.	
68	Draw	54–3–11	Jackie Clark	PTS	10	Mar 9, 1923	Auditorium, Atlanta, Georgia, U.S.	
67	Win	54–3–10	Johnny Klesch	PTS	10	Mar 1, 1923	Georgia A.C., Macon, Georgia, U.S.	
66	Win	53–3–10	Billy McGowan	PTS	10	Feb 27, 1923	Rome, Georgia, U.S.	
65	Win	52–3–10	Battling Kuhn	PTS	10	Feb 8, 1923	Macon, Georgia, U.S.	
64	Win	51–3–10	Harry Krohn	PTS	10	Jan 30, 1923	Auditorium, Atlanta, Georgia, U.S.	
63	Win	50–3–10	Tony Marullo	TKO	9 (15)	Jan 26, 1923	Tulane Arena, New Orleans, Louisiana, U.S.	
62	Win	49–3–10	George Shade	PTS	10	Jan 18, 1923	Municipal Auditorium, Macon, Georgia, U.S.	
61	Win	48–3–10	Jack Middleton	KO	1 (10)	Jan 1, 1923	Municipal Auditorium, Macon, Georgia, U.S.	
60	Win	47–3–10	Jack Denham	KO	7 (10)	Dec 29, 1922	Birmingham, Alabama, U.S.	
59	Win	46–3–10	Jack Turner	PTS	8	Dec 26, 1922	National Sanatorium, Johnson City, Tennessee, U.S.	
58	Win	45–3–10	Jimmy King	PTS	10	Dec 7, 1922	Macon, Georgia, U.S.	
57	Win	44–3–10	Billy McGowan	PTS	10	Dec 1, 1922	Quitman, Georgia, U.S.	Retained welterweight championship of the south
56	Win	43–3–10	Tony Marullo	PTS	12	Nov 18, 1922	Fronton Jai-Alai, Havana, Cuba	
55	Win	42–3–10	Jack Denham	PTS	10	Nov 9, 1922	City Auditorium, Macon, Georgia, U.S.	
54	Win	41–3–10	Tiger Toro	PTS	6	Oct 20, 1922	Sanatorium, Johnson City, Tennessee, U.S.	
53	Win	40–3–10	Young Wallace	KO	10 (10)	Oct 14, 1922	Havana, Cuba	
52	Win	39–3–10	James Red Herring	PTS	10	Oct 4, 1922	Central City Park, Macon, Georgia, U.S.	
51	Win	38–3–10	Jojo Johnson	KO	4 (10)	Sep 29, 1922	Thomasville, Georgia, U.S.	
50	Win	37–3–10	Eddie Hanlon	KO	1 (10)	Sep 14, 1922	Americus, Georgia, U.S.	
49	Draw	36–3–10	James Red Herring	PTS	10	Sep 4, 1922	Central City Park, Macon, Georgia, U.S.	Retained Southern welterweight title
48	Win	36–3–9	Battling Joe Kennedy	KO	3 (10)	Aug 17, 1922	Bainbridge, Georgia, U.S.	
47	Win	35–3–9	Kid Suby	PTS	10	Aug 9, 1922	Driving Park, Columbus, Georgia, U.S.	
46	Win	34–3–9	Jimmy Conway	PTS	10	Aug 4, 1922	Savannah, Georgia, U.S.	
45	Win	33–3–9	Jack Turner	KO	8 (10)	Jul 27, 1922	Macon, Georgia, U.S.	
44	Win	32–3–9	Jake Abel	PTS	10	Jul 4, 1922	Central City Park, Macon, Georgia, U.S.	Won welterweight championship of the south
43	Loss	31–3–9	Battling Budd	NWS	10	Jun 12, 1922	Charlotte, North Carolina, U.S.	
42	Win	31–2–9	Johnny Flynn	PTS	8	Jun 6, 1922	Chattanooga, Tennessee, U.S.	
41	Win	30–2–9	Larry Avera	PTS	10	Jun 2, 1922	Rylander Theater, Americus, Georgia, U.S.	
40	Win	29–2–9	Joe Marks	PTS	10	May 24, 1922	City Auditorium, Macon, Georgia, U.S.	
39	Draw	28–2–9	Battling Budd	PTS	10	May 18, 1922	Municipal Auditorium, Albany, Georgia, U.S.	
38	Draw	28–2–8	Battling Budd	PTS	10	May 3, 1922	City Auditorium, Macon, Georgia, U.S.	
37	Draw	28–2–7	Larry Avera	PTS	10	Apr 25, 1922	Ponce de Leon Ballpark, Atlanta, Georgia, U.S.	
36	Win	28–2–6	Battling Kelly	PTS	8	Apr 21, 1922	Armory, Nashville, Tennessee, U.S.	
35	Win	27–2–6	Terry Nelson	PTS	10	Apr 6, 1922	City Auditorium, Albany, Georgia, U.S.	
34	Loss	26–2–6	Battling Budd	PTS	10	Mar 28, 1922	Forsyth Street Arena, Atlanta, Georgia, U.S.	
33	Win	26–1–6	Spike Maloney	KO	6 (10)	Mar 23, 1922	Municipal Auditorium, Macon, Georgia, U.S.	
32	Win	25–1–6	Battling Kelly	PTS	10	Mar 13, 1922	Birmingham, Alabama, U.S.	
31	Draw	24–1–6	Larry Avera	PTS	10	Mar 7, 1922	American Legion, Atlanta, Georgia, U.S.	
30	Win	24–1–5	Sailor Blanque	PTS	10	Feb 13, 1922	Birmingham A.C., Birmingham, Alabama, U.S.	
29	Win	23–1–5	Battling Budd	PTS	10	Feb 2, 1922	City Auditorium, Macon, Georgia, U.S.	
28	Draw	22–1–5	Freddie Boorde	PTS	10	Jan 23, 1922	Birmingham, Alabama, U.S.	
27	Win	22–1–4	Jack Brady	KO	1 (10)	Jan 16, 1922	Columbia Theater, Columbia, South Carolina, U.S.	
26	Draw	21–1–4	Freddie Boorde	PTS	10	Dec 30, 1921	Columbus A.C., Columbus, Georgia, U.S.	Retained Southern featherweight title
25	Draw	21–1–3	Battling Budd	PTS	10	Dec 26, 1921	Municipal Auditorium, Atlanta, Georgia, U.S.	
24	Win	21–1–2	Freddie Boorde	PTS	10	Dec 19, 1921	City Auditorium, Macon, Georgia, U.S.	
23	Win	20–1–2	Fearless Ferns	PTS	10	Dec 5, 1921	Auditorium, Atlanta, Georgia, U.S.	Won vacant USA Georgia State lightweight title
22	Win	19–1–2	Dick Leonard	PTS	10	Nov 29, 1921	Municipal Auditorium, Savannah, Georgia, U.S.	
21	Draw	18–1–2	Freddie Boorde	PTS	10	Nov 9, 1921	Columbus A.C., Columbus, Georgia, U.S.	Retained Southern featherweight title
20	Win	18–1–1	Joe Metranga	PTS	10	Oct 25, 1921	Auditorium, Atlanta, Georgia, U.S.	
19	Win	17–1–1	Rabbit Palmer	PTS	10	Oct 10, 1921	City Auditorium, Macon, Georgia, U.S.	
18	Win	16–1–1	Red Keenan	KO	5 (10)	Sep 29, 1921	Springer Opera House, Columbus, Georgia, U.S.	
17	Draw	15–1–1	Fearless Ferns	PTS	10	Sep 5, 1921	Central City Park, Macon, Georgia, U.S.	
16	Win	15–1	Freddie Boorde	PTS	10	Aug 15, 1921	Auditorium, Atlanta, Georgia, U.S.	Retained Southern featherweight title
15	Win	14–1	Joe Peck	PTS	10	Aug 4, 1921	Central City Park, Macon, Georgia, U.S.	
14	Win	13–1	Kid Young	KO	8 (10)	Jul 12, 1921	Business Men's A.C., Atlanta, Georgia, U.S.	
13	Win	12–1	Kid Bartlett	TKO	9 (10)	Jul 4, 1921	Central City Park, Macon, Georgia, U.S.	
12	Win	11–1	Jim Waites	KO	3 (10)	Jun 23, 1921	City Auditorium, Macon, Georgia, U.S.	
11	Win	10–1	Duette Allred	KO	2 (10)	Jun 13, 1921	Business Men's A.C., Atlanta, Georgia, U.S.	
10	Win	9–1	Dick Leonard	PTS	10	Jun 7, 1921	Business Men's A.C., Atlanta, Georgia, U.S.	
9	Win	8–1	Dick Leonard	PTS	10	May 26, 1921	City Auditorium, Macon, Georgia, U.S.	Won vacant USA Georgia State featherweight title
8	Win	7–1	Lou Gomez	KO	3 (10)	May 5, 1921	City Auditorium, Macon, Georgia, U.S.	
7	Win	6–1	Battling Mishound	PTS	10	Apr 5, 1921	Auditorium, Atlanta, Georgia, U.S.	
6	Loss	5–1	Dick Leonard	PTS	8	Mar 30, 1921	Auditorium, Savannah, Georgia, U.S.	
5	Win	5–0	Benny Harvey	PTS	10	Mar 22, 1921	Auditorium, Atlanta, Georgia, U.S.	
4	Win	4–0	Kid Sullivan	KO	1 (6)	Feb 18, 1921	Auditorium, Opera House, Milledgeville, Georgia, U.S.	
3	Win	3–0	Tim O'Dowd	KO	1 (6)	Feb 15, 1921	Auditorium, Atlanta, Georgia, U.S.	
2	Win	2–0	Johnny Kid Nappie	PTS	4	Feb 9, 1921	Auditorium, Atlanta, Georgia, U.S.	
1	Win	1–0	Billy Kid Dombe	PTS	4	Jan 17, 1921	Auditorium, Atlanta, Georgia, U.S.	
