= Senator Herring (disambiguation) =

Clyde L. Herring (1879–1945) was a U.S. Senator from Iowa from 1937 to 1943. Senator Herring may also refer to:

- Mark Herring (born 1961), Virginia State Senate
- Thomas H. Herring (1812–1874), New Jersey State Senate
