= James Red Herring =

American boxer

Personal information
- Nickname: Rebel Red
- Born: James Bryan Herring; March 19, 1896 Paducah, Kentucky, U.S.
- Died: May 7, 1974 (aged 78) Barneveld, Oneida County, New York, U.S.
- Height: 5 ft 6.5 in (1.69 m)
- Weight: Light welterweight

Boxing career
- Stance: Orthodox

Boxing record
- Total fights: 279; with the inclusion of newspaper decisions
- Wins: 189
- Win by KO: 80
- Losses: 44
- Draws: 43
- No contests: 1

James Bryan Herring (March 19, 1896 – May 7, 1974), also known as Red Herring, was an American boxer, who claimed the world light welterweight championship in 1925.

== Early life and career ==
Herring was born on March 19, 1896, in Paducah, Kentucky, and began boxing in 1913 when he won a bout as a featherweight by knockout on a benefit card for striking railroad workers in Paducah.

He was a Sergeant in the U.S. Army during World War I, and was stationed at both Camp Pike, Arkansas and Camp Shelby, Mississippi where he served as a boxing instructor. He claimed to have gone 35-0-1 in 36 army bouts with the draw coming against the camp's heavyweight. He was the All-Southern Army Lightweight Champion in 1917. He is also said to have been the Featherweight, Lightweight, and Welterweight Champion at Camp Shelby.

=== Bouts with champions Benny Leonard and Young Stribling ===
After winning a Lightweight elimination tournament in the South, Herring got a chance to meet World Lightweight Champion Benny Leonard on December 19, 1919, in Memphis, Tennessee, losing in an early sixth-round technical knockout. Leonard outmaneuvered Herring with speed and footwork, slipping the half dozen punches thrown by his opponent, with most going well wide of their mark. By the fifth, Herring was helpless against the ropes with the crowd roaring for Leonard to finish the match. Leonard fought with a deadly left, and sent terrific blows to the head and body. One minute into the sixth, Leonard backed Herring into a neutral corner and put him on the canvas with three short rights to the jaw, that led the referee to end the bout at 1:10, after Herring attempted to rise after his first count. The Arkansas Democrat gave Leonard five rounds, with the fourth even. Herring remained on his feet through the first five rounds, but took considerable punishment from the lightweight champion.

Herring fought for the Southern Lightweight Title on August 2, 1920, against Sailor Friedman and won in a 12-round newspaper decision in Wichita Falls, Texas. Friedman fought many of the top lightweight contenders of his era, including Benny Leonard, Lew Tendler, and welterweight Pinky Mitchell.

Herring won on a third-round disqualification to Ray Long on October 18, 1920, in Pittsburgh, Pennsylvania. The foul occurred from an odd turn of events, when the arena began to collapse, forcing Long to slip and strike Herring below the belt, incapacitating him. Many in the crowd felt the call should have been for a no contest. The fighting was fast, close, and action-packed in the first two rounds according to ringside observers.

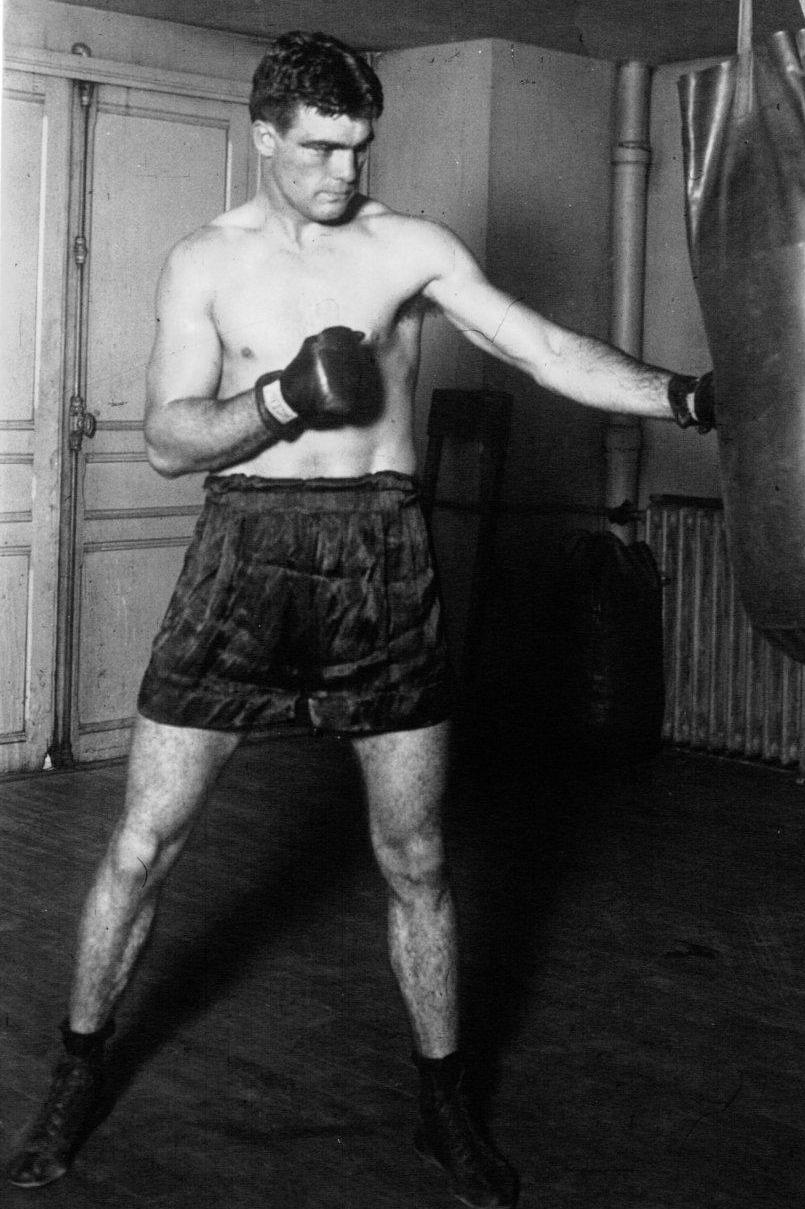
Young Stribling

Herring fought Young Stribling twice in 1922 in Macon, Georgia, earning a 10-round draw in their first meeting and losing a 10-round decision in their second. The referee awarded two rounds to each contestant, with the rest even in their first bout on September 4. The sizable crowd of 4,000, were satisfied with the performance of the contestants competing for the Southern Welterweight title and were enthralled as they watched Stribling try desperately to deliver a knockout blow in the final rounds. In their second bout on October 4, Herring was down in the third for a count of nine, and though the match was not entirely one-sided, the referee awarded five rounds to Stribling with only one to Herring. Stribling would later tell the New Yorker magazine that Herring hit him with one of the hardest punches he had ever felt in his career.

Bobby Green dropped a 10-round points decision to Herring in Hot Springs, Arkansas on April 5, 1923. A month later on May 7, Herring lost to Green in an eight-round points decision in Memphis. Green claimed to have broken his hand in the second round according to the Atlanta Constitution.

Herring defeated Frankie Jones at the Auditorium in Atlanta, Georgia on October 31, 1923. Jones was a prolific boxer but only a fringe contender through his career. Herring had won a previous meeting on April 9, 1923, an eight-round points decision in Memphis, Tennessee, and a 12-round newspaper decision in Louisville on October 16, 1922. In their Memphis bout in October 1922, Herring won eleven rounds decisively, with Jones taking a serious beating and winning only the eighth. Much of the punishment Jones received in the first half of the fight were blows to the chest and body. In the eighth Jones was able to back Herring against the ropes and land some solid punches, though he connected sporadically throughout the match with a few blows to the jaw. In their April 1923 bout, Herring had Jones nearly knocked out and hanging on in the last three rounds.

Herring defeated Clyde Jeakle on October 23, 1923, in a 10-round points decision in Atlanta, Georgia. Though seen as an underdog, Herring delivered a strong lacing to Jeakle throughout the fast bout. He would defeat Jeakle again on June 13, 1924, in a 10-round newspaper decision. Jeakle, a skilled opponent with a strong punch, would contend for the NYSAC world lightweight championship in a 1925 tournament at Madison Square Garden.

=== Contending for the European lightweight title ===
Herring defeated European and BBofC British lightweight champion Harry Mason on May 5, 1924, in a 10-round points decision at Columbus, Georgia. Herring was awarded five of the 10 rounds, with Mason only two, and three even. By one newspaper account, Herring took the European title by defeating Mason, though the fight may have been required to have taken place in Europe to apply. With a clear points margin, Herring appeared to have had Mason nearly knocked out in the second, but could not deliver a final blow to end the bout.

Fighting as a lightweight, Mason defeated Larry Avera by newspaper decision on August 21, 1924, in a tame six-round semi-final bout in Freemont, Ohio.

On December 22, 1924, Herring fought for the "Southern Lightweight Title", against Boots Antley in Columbus, Ohio, but drew in a 10-round points decision.

== Taking a disputed World Jr. Welterweight Championship ==
Herring won the World Jr. Welterweight title March 27, 1925 from Pinky Mitchell in Detroit, when Mitchell was disqualified by referee Slim McClelland. Herring's claim to the title was disputed as Mitchell weighed in at 146 pounds, well above the Jr. Welterweight limit. Furthermore, the Wisconsin Boxing Commission Chairman, A. J. Hedding noted that regulations were not followed in the match, and therefore Herring did not have claim to the belt. Nonetheless, Herring claimed the title until 1929. He was also photographed with the title at times well after 1925.

On March 31, 1925, Herring defended his title against Young Ketchell, in what was billed as an NBA world super lightweight title. Herring lost the match in a third-round technical knockout in Nashville.

=== Loss to future champion Mushy Callahan ===
Herring lost to future world junior welterweight champion Mushy Callahan before a packed house of around 10,000, on August 18, 1925, in a 10-round points decision in Vernon, California. Callahan kept his long left aimed at Herring's face, and used vicious swings to the body to gain an advantage in points in nearly every round but the first. Though the bout was not billed as a title match, Herring's claim to the junior welterweight title, significantly diminished as valid in the eyes of most after 1926.

On September 1, 1925, Herring defeated Charley O'Connell in a 10-round points decision in Vernon, California. In a slow, and close fight, Herring piled on in the 10th with rights and lefts to the head and body, giving him the margin on points. Herring appeared to be the superior boxer in the infighting, but the bout was listless with clinching in the early rounds, and many fans left during the fifth. A highly rated opponent, in March 1925 O'Connell had contended for the world lightweight title against Solly Seeman.

Herring defeated Sid Barbarian on November 13, 1925, in 10 rounds on points at Danceland Arena in Detroit. Herring was credited with five rounds, two were given to Barbarian, and three were ruled a draw. Barbarian had earlier won a 10-round points decision on January 16, 1925, at Detroit's Arena Gardens. Barbarian piled up a lead in the first six rounds, which Herring was unable to compensate for in the final four, though he appeared to have gained points in each of the final rounds.

Herring lost a bout to Sargent Sammy Baker in a 10-round preliminary bout on June 10, 1926, at New York's Yankee Stadium. Baker knocked down Herring for a count of four in the fifth, but it was the only knockdown of the bout. Toward the later rounds, Herring worked in closer, and both boxers fought toe to toe, though the bout was slow going in the early rounds.

Before a crowd of 5,000, Herring dropped a 12-round points decision to the skilled Nick Testo on August 24, 1926, in a charity bout at the Stadium in Troy, New York. Herring was down once in round 11 and twice in round 12. In their match the following month, Herring lost in a fifth-round disqualification when he hit Testo while on one knee. In a rough fight, Testo had been down once in the third and twice in the fifth.

Herring defeated Paul Gulotta on August 30, 1927, in a 10-round points decision at the Stadium in Troy, New York. He defeated Gulotta in March 1927 in a 10-round points decision in Schenectady, New York, though had drawn with him the previous month in the same city.

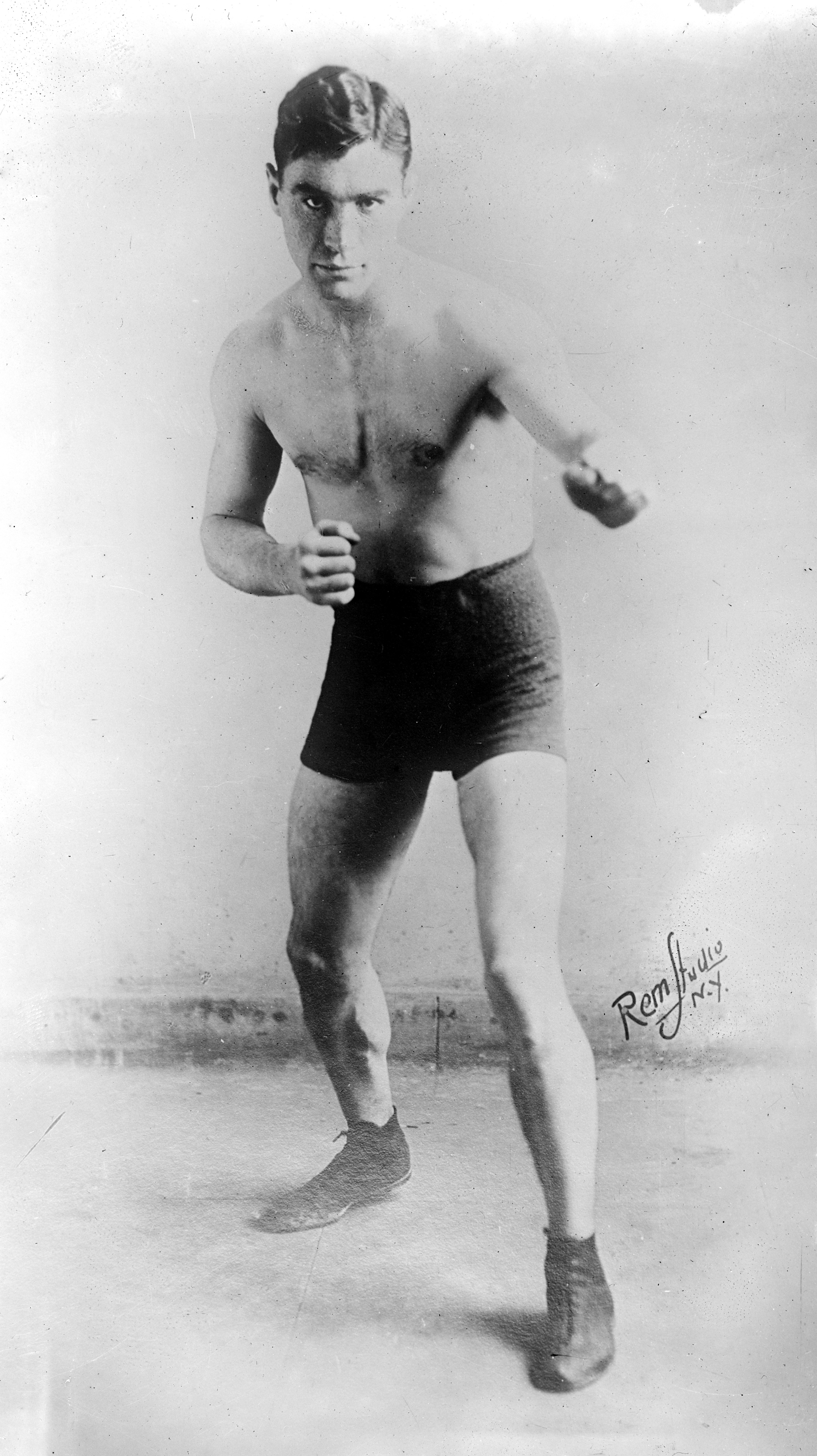
Welterweight Jack Britton

Herring lost in a fifth-round technical knockout to Andy Divodi on September 19, 1927, at the Stadium in Troy, New York. Herring was not able to continue due to a cut on his mouth and did not answer the bell for the fifth round.

On April 22, 1929, he defeated an aging 44-year-old Jack Britton, a long-reigning former world welterweight champion, in an eight-round points decision at the Stadium in Memphis. The fighting was fast and furious but the judges ultimately decided in Herring's favor.

Herring defeated Alex Simms on August 8, 1929, in Greenwood, Mississippi. His defense was rarely penetrated by a blow, and he showed strength and speed throughout the 10-round bout, despite allowing Simms to take the lead in the fighting. In two previous meetings in March and April 1929, Herring had lost and drawn with Simms in eight-round decisions in Memphis.

Herring drew with Clyde Hull in a close eight-round points decision on August 12, 1929, at Hodges Field in Memphis. The Memphis Commercial-Appeal had Herring winning three rounds, with none to Hull, and the rest even.

Herring retired from boxing in 1930 after fighting a 10-round draw with former British Light and Welterweight titleholder Harry Mason at Utica Stadium. Herring returned to the ring in 1933 for four fights, in an attempt to bring fans to Convention Hall in Utica where he was a fight promoter from 1933 to 1937.

== Outside the ring ==
Herring ran a gym in Utica, New York in the late 1920s, operated by minor league baseball player Art Mills when Herring was on the road. From 1938 to 1940, he was the Recreational Director for the town of New Hartford, New York, and from 1955 to 1960 he served as the athletic director at Griffis Air Force Base in Rome, New York.

== Death ==
Herring died at home in Barneveld, Oneida County, New York, on May 7, 1974, after a brief illness. After funeral services on May 10, he was laid to rest in Carr Cemetery in Marcy, New York.

Achievements
Preceded by Pinky Mitchell	World Light Welterweight Champion; March 27, 1925 – 1929 Disputed	Succeeded by Mushy Callahan
