= Robert Herring (cricketer) =

Australian cricketer

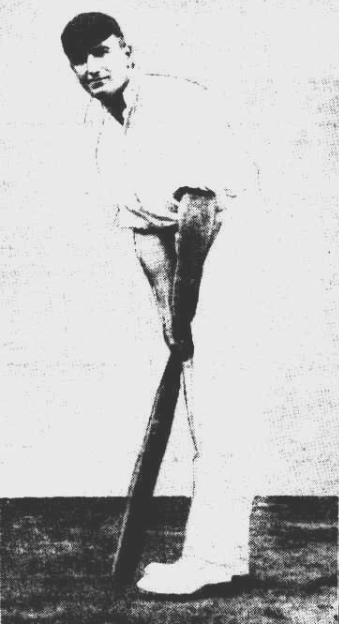

Personal information
- Born: 8 June 1898; Maryborough, Australia
- Died: 8 October 1964 (aged 66); Melbourne, Australia

Domestic team information
- Years: Team
- 1923-1924: Victoria
- Source: Cricinfo, 20 November 2015

Robert "Bob" Herring (8 June 1898 – 8 October 1964) was an Australian cricketer. He played two first-class cricket matches for Victoria between 1923 and 1924.

== Cricket career ==
Bob was born in Maryborough into the Herring family which was notable for producing several prominent Victorian country cricketers. He attended Melbourne Grammar School and played for the school side where he was noticed as a hard hitting batsman and became a wicket keeper. After finishing school he played for Melbourne in district cricket in the 1917-18 season averaging over 50, however WWI interrupted his career and he served in the military.

After returning home Herring played for Maryborough in country cricket and achieved aggregates of over 1000 runs in his early seasons. He became captain of Maryborough, and his performances for the side earned him a selection for Victoria in a game against Tasmania in 1923 in which he scored 66 in Victoria's innings of 1069 causing significant interest in him in Melbourne. He was also selected as twelfth man in a Victorian squad which played in South Australia. In 1924 he began playing for Melbourne in district cricket again.

== See also ==
- List of Victoria first-class cricketers
