= Paki (disambiguation) =

Paki is a derogatory term for a person of Pakistani or South Asian background.

Paki may also refer to:

- Paki, California, former settlement in Butte County
- Pākī (1808–1855), Hawaiian high chief during the reign of King Kamehameha III
- Kipnuk Airport (ICAO code PAKI), Kipnuk, Alaska
- Paki Afu (born 1990), Tongan footballer

== See also ==
- Pâquis
- Ithikkara Pakki, a Muslim outlaw who lived in the 19th century Travancore Kingdom
- Tsikoudia (ρακί)
- Packy (disambiguation)
- Pakistan (disambiguation)
