= Pake =

Pake may refer to:

- Password-authenticated key exchange (PAKE)
- Pākē, Hawaiian language term for Chinese in Hawaii
- Pake, California
- Páké, alternative name of Brateș
- Ralph Pake
- George Pake
- Pake McEntire
- Pake doublet
