= Matt Wells (boxer) =

English boxer (1886–1953)

Mat Wells
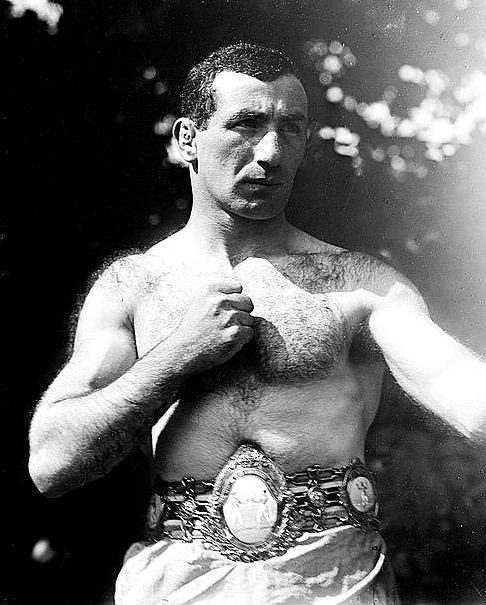
- Wells in 1911 as Lightweight Champ

Personal information
- Born: 14 December 1886 Walworth, London
- Died: 27 June 1953 (aged 66) London, England
- Height: 5 ft 4 in (1.63 m)
- Weight: Lightweight; Welterweight

Boxing career
- Stance: Orthodox

Boxing record
- Total fights: 86
- Wins: 50
- Win by KO: 7
- Losses: 30
- Draws: 3
- No contests: 3

Matthew Wells (14 December 1886 – 27 June 1953) was a British professional boxer in the lightweight and welterweight divisions. In 1911, he held the Lightweight Championship of Great Britain, and in 1914 he claimed the Welterweight Championship of Britain and the Welterweight Championship of the World.

== Biography ==
He was born in Walworth, London on 4 December 1886 and died in London on 27 June 1953.

== Amateur career ==
During his amateur career, he held the Amateur Boxing Association British featherweight title, when boxing out of the Lynn ABC, from 1904 to 1907.

== Competing in the Olympics ==
He competed in the 1908 Summer Olympics in London. In the lightweight event he was eliminated in the quarter-finals after losing to Frederick Grace who later won the gold medal.

== Professional career ==
=== 1911 British title ===
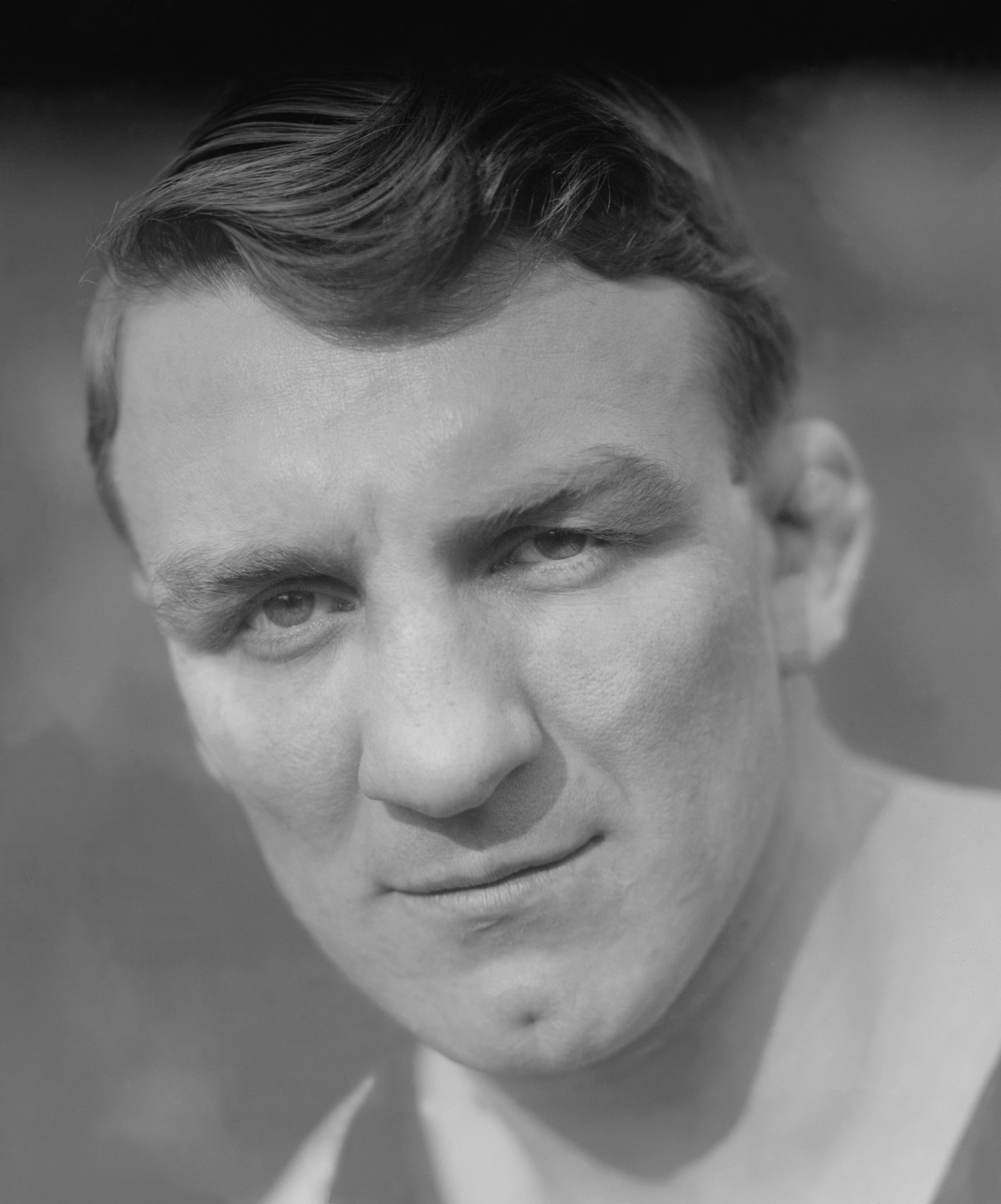
Freddie Welsh

Wells turned pro in 1909. On 27 February 1911, at the National Sporting Club in London he defeated Freddie Welsh in a twenty-round bout to win the lightweight championship of Great Britain and take home the Lonsdale belt, becoming the first Jewish boxer to hold the honor. The win simultaneously bestowed the EBU's (European Boxing Union) lightweight championship.

On 2 June 1911, he defeated the great Jewish New York boxer Leach Cross at the Harlem Casino in New York by newspaper decision. The Montreal Gazette noted that the "bout went the full ten rounds, Wells having all the better of it." The New York Times agreed with the decision of the Gazette. Wells delivered two hard blows in the ninth that proved his hitting power against a boxer who was noted for exceptional defensive skills.

Remarkably, only three weeks after defeating Leach Cross, Wells defeated highly rated boxer "Philadelphia" Pal Moore on 24 June 1911 in a twelve round points decision at the Armory in Boston. Moore fought a host of champions in his career.

Wells defeated "Knockout" Brown before an enthusiastic crowd as large as 14,000 on 30 August 1911 in a ten round newspaper decision at New York's famed Madison Square Garden. The bout was so popular, swarms of onlookers waiting to get in broke through the windows to gain entry. Wells employed a cool, well calculated defense which baffled Brown throughout the bout. Brown could not defend against Wells's left jab which played about his face at great speed, helping Wells to take as many as seven rounds. The match was one of the first legal boxing matches in New York that allowed the purchase of tickets rather than a membership in a club, and the Garden was packed with fans. A near riot occurred as those who were turned away rushed into the auditorium to try to purchase additional tickets to obtain seating. Ten thousand were inside the Garden, with an additional five thousand outside hoping to obtain seats. Wells used his right almost at will throughout the bout, and dodged the blows of Brown by shifting his body or back stepping with exceptional speed. Brown used an effective left and got in some strong blows to Wells's face, but they rarely fazed Wells, nor slowed his attack. He wisely crowded Brown in the tenth to avoid a long range haymaker that might cause a knockout.

On 26 April 1912 he lost to the exceptional American boxer Packey McFarland at Madison Square Garden, in Manhattan, New York City. The Boston Globe considered McFarland the better boxer in each of the ten rounds, scoring with frequent right uppercuts to the face and body. As he repeatedly but cautiously found openings to use his right, McFarland allowed Wells to remain the aggressor with head down through much of the fight. In major competition, McFarland was nearly undefeated, yet never managed to win a title.

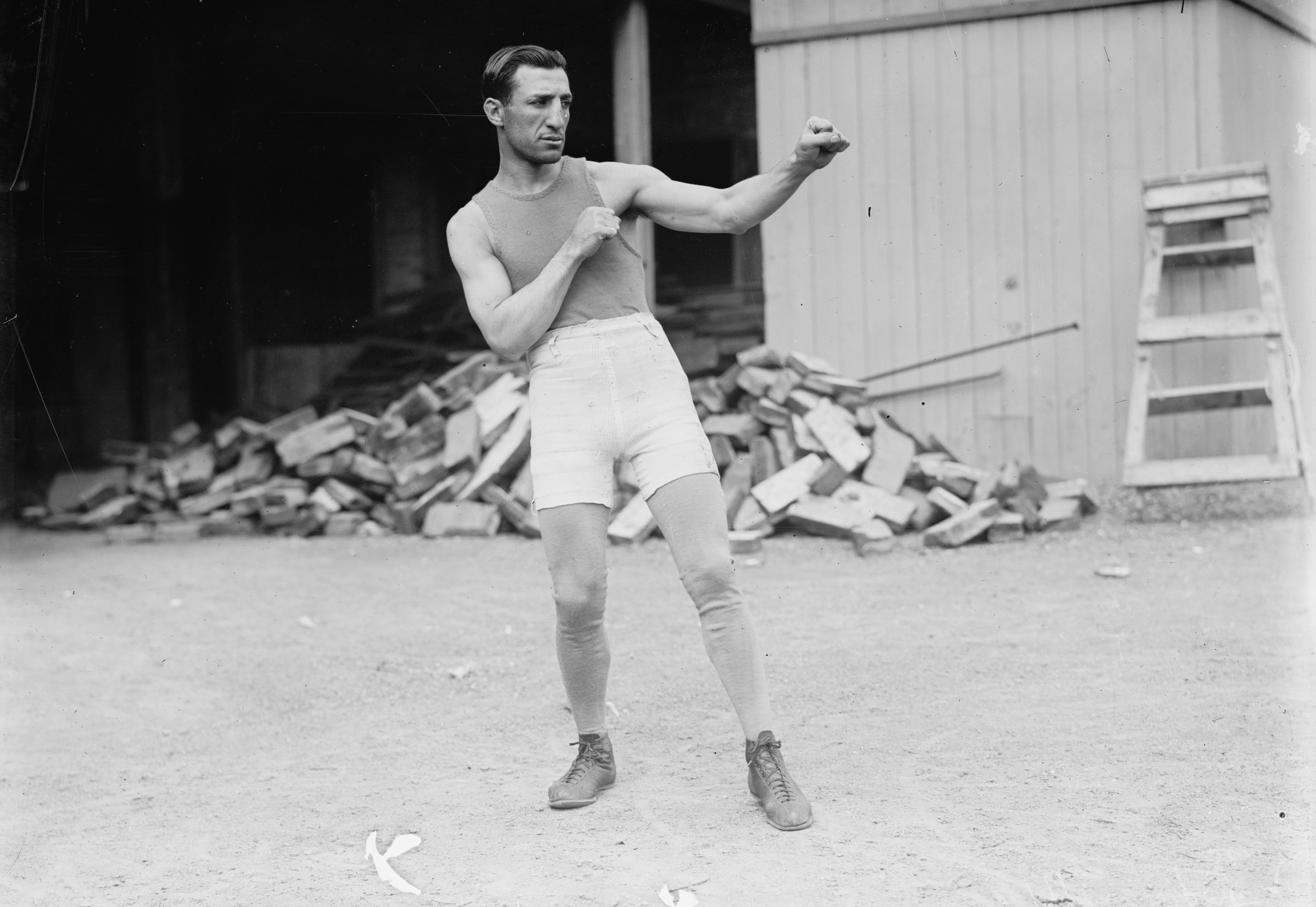
Abe Attell

Wells impressively defeated reigning World Featherweight Champion Abe Attell on 20 September 1911 in New York. Attell was nearing the end of his ten-year reign as champion and his bout with Wells was not made a title fight partly because he was outweighed by Wells. The Pittsburgh Press wrote the fight was "the greatest exhibition of scientific boxing that has been seen here in years. The Press went on to note that "although Attell was clearly outpointed, his defeat was not a disgrace or anything like it for Wells was heavier, stronger, taller, and had a longer reach."

Wells defeated British boxer and former claimant of the 1907 British sanctioned World Bantamweight championship Owen Moran on 27 September 1913 in Sydney Stadium in Australia. Moran was a former contender for the World Featherweight championship against Abe Attell on New Years Day 1908 in Colma, California, but failed to knockout Attell in 25 rounds.

Wells defeated American Ray Bronson, former holder of the World Welterweight Championship, in a seventh round technical knockout in Sydney, Australia on 28 February 1914. Wells "inflicted severe punishment on the American" and his seconds threw in the towel at the end of the seventh round. Bronson, who considered retiring after the loss, would not fight again for a decade, and then retire.

Tom McCormick

=== 1914 title wins ===
On 21 March 1914 he won the Welterweight Championship of Britain and Welterweight Championship of the World by defeating Tom McCormick in a 20-round points decision at Sydney Stadium in New South Wales, Australia. On 1 June 1915, he lost the welterweight title to Mike Glover in a twelve-round decision at the arena in Boston, Massachusetts. The Boston Globe noted that Wells lacked the power he usually showed in his punch but was ready to mix with Glover, who had he been fighting less cautiously may have scored a knockout. Wells competed for the British title again unsuccessfully against Johnny Basham on 13 November 1919 in Holborn Stadium in London.

Wells lost decisively to future World Feather and Junior Lightweight champion Johnny Dundee in a twelve round points decision in Boston on 16 May 1916. In the one sided affair, Dundee jabbed and hooked Wells to the face and body throughout the bout. Dundee showed great blocking during the infighting where he also scored frequently and used fast footwork to elude punches. Wells had previously lost to Dundee in a twelve round points decision before 3,500 fans on 10 December 1915 in New Haven that featured skilled blocking and countering throughout, but in which Dundee, the aggressor, always seemed to have the advantage.

Wells succumbed to his only knockout on 11 July 1916, from the talented Chicago lightweight Charley White. In the fifth round, Wells' manager Danny Morgan stepped in to stop the fight. Wells was dazed by a left to the chest in the third round, though he fought on. At the end of the fourth, White caught Wells with a right hook as he rushed forward, putting him on the canvas for a count of five. He was down again for a count of eight from a left to the jaw. On the opening of the fifth, White went after Wells holding him with his right and battering him with his left. Wells's manager ended the bout a minute into the round.

=== 1919 title fight ===
Wells lost to Johnny Basham for the BBofC Welterweight Championship and the Commonwealth Welterweight Championship in a twenty round points decision in Holborn, England on 13 November 1919. The bloody affair involved too much clinching by Basham, and a too frequent use of head butts by Wells. By the eleventh, Wells, the older boxer by four years, was beginning to show signs of fatigue, but he never failed to mix when required. With a clear advantage, Basham excelled in long range fighting, having a reach advantage of several inches, but he seemed to have the better of the infighting as well. The eighteenth through twentieth rounds were all Basham's, who added to an already significant advantage in points, and though Wells took a beating and his face was bloody by the later rounds, he remained on his feet throughout the match. Wells had formerly lost to Basham in a fifteen round points decision at the London Opera House on 22 March 1915. Welsh had gained a bit of weight prior to the match which may have affected his speed, and Basham had continued to improve his skills in the previous year.

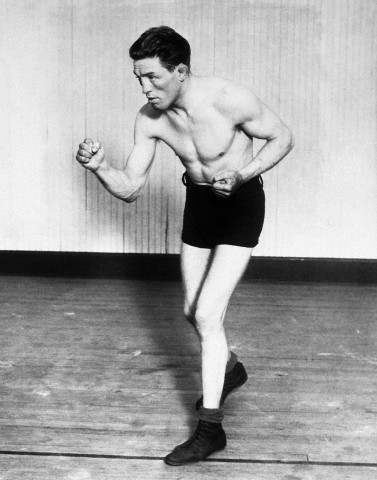
Ted "Kid" Lewis

On 26 December 1919, Wells lost to the accomplished English boxer Ted "Kid" Lewis in twelve of twenty rounds at Royal Albert Hall in Kensington. Lewis and Charley White became the only two boxers in Welles's career to stop him before the end of a fight. Taking a serious beating, Wells's face was cut badly and his nose was broken, before he gave up the unequal struggle in the twelfth.

He was inducted into the International Jewish Sports Hall of Fame in 2007.

== Professional boxing record ==
All information in this section is derived from BoxRec, unless otherwise stated.

=== Official record ===
85 fights	31 wins	18 losses
By knockout	7	2
By decision	22	14
By disqualification	2	2
Draws	2	
No contests	3	
Newspaper decisions/draws	31	

All newspaper decisions are officially regarded as “no decision” bouts and are not counted in the win/loss/draw column.

No.	Result	Record	Opponent	Type	Round	Date	Location	Notes
86	Win	31–18–2 (35)	Jack Hart	PTS	15	May 12, 1922	Premierland, Whitechapel, London, England	
85	Win	30–18–2 (35)	Stanley Glen	PTS	15	Apr 17, 1922	Tredegar Road Drill Hall, Bow, London, England	
84	Loss	29–18–2 (35)	Ted Moore	PTS	15	Dec 29, 1921	Premierland, Whitechapel, London, England	
83	Win	29–17–2 (35)	Clement Carlos	TKO	13 (15)	Oct 31, 1921	National Sporting Club, Covent Garden, London, England	
82	Loss	28–17–2 (35)	Seaman Nobby Hall	PTS	15	Aug 31, 1921	Cosmopolitan Gymnasium, Plymouth, Devon, England	
81	Win	28–16–2 (35)	Joe Davis	TKO	10 (15)	Dec 11, 1920	The Dome, Brighton, Sussex, England	
80	Win	27–16–2 (35)	Kid Plested	KO	6 (15)	Nov 27, 1920	Tyneside Stadium, Wallsend, Tyne and Wear, England	
79	Loss	26–16–2 (35)	Ted Moore	DQ	13 (20)	Aug 7, 1920	The Ring, Blackfriars Road, Southwark, London, England	
78	Win	26–15–2 (35)	Joe Attwood	TKO	5 (20)	Jun 26, 1920	The Ring, Blackfriars Road, Southwark, London, England	
77	Win	25–15–2 (35)	Gus Platts	PTS	20	Jun 12, 1920	Pheasant Inn Grounds, Carbrook, Yorkshire, England	
76	Win	24–15–2 (35)	Fred Newberry	PTS	20	Jun 4, 1920	The Peoples' Palace, Mile End, London, England	
75	Win	23–15–2 (35)	Bermondsey Billy Wells	DQ	15 (20)	May 8, 1920	The Ring, Blackfriars Road, Southwark, London, England	Billy Wells disqualified for butting Matt Wells in the stomach
74	Loss	22–15–2 (35)	Ted Moore	PTS	20	Apr 24, 1920	Palace Theatre, Plymouth, Devon, England	
73	Loss	22–14–2 (35)	Phil Bloom	PTS	15	Mar 18, 1920	Holborn Stadium, Holborn, London, England	
72	Loss	22–13–2 (35)	Ted Kid Lewis	RTD	12 (20)	Dec 26, 1919	Royal Albert Hall, Kensington, London, England	
71	Loss	22–12–2 (35)	Johnny Basham	PTS	20	Nov 13, 1919	Holborn Stadium, Holborn, London, England	For Commonwealth and BBBofC British welterweight titles
70	Win	22–11–2 (35)	Kid Carter	PTS	20	Oct 20, 1919	National Sporting Club, Covent Garden, London, England	
69	Win	21–11–2 (35)	Harlem Eddie Kelly	PTS	12	Oct 29, 1917	20th Century A.C., Pittsfield, Massachusetts, U.S.	
68	Win	20–11–2 (35)	Young Maxwell	DQ	4 (?)	Oct 9, 1917	Albany, New York, U.S.	Some sources have this has a TKO win in four for Wells while a few other sources have Wells losing by DQ in four
67	NC	19–11–2 (35)	Charley White	NC	9 (10)	Oct 5, 1917	Arena, Syracuse, New York, U.S.	Bout stopped due to stalling
66	Win	19–11–2 (34)	Frankie Nelson	NWS	10	Sep 28, 1917	Arena, Syracuse, New York, U.S.	
65	Loss	19–11–2 (33)	Bryan Downey	NWS	12	Sep 17, 1917	Coliseum, Columbus, Ohio, U.S.	
64	Loss	19–11–2 (32)	Bryan Downey	NWS	10	Aug 27, 1917	Airdome A.C., Rochester, New York, U.S.	
63	Win	19–11–2 (31)	Kid Curley	NWS	10	Jun 19, 1917	Urban Liberty Park, Buffalo, New York, U.S.	
62	Win	19–11–2 (30)	Phil Bloom	NWS	10	Jun 16, 1917	Broadway S.C., Brooklyn, New York City, New York, U.S.	
61	Win	19–11–2 (29)	Walter Mohr	NWS	10	Jun 11, 1917	Airdome A.C., Rochester, New York, U.S.	
60	Loss	19–11–2 (28)	Lockport Jimmy Duffy	PTS	10	May 25, 1917	Hamilton, Ontario, Canada	
59	Win	19–11–2 (27)	Walter Mohr	NWS	10	May 1, 1917	National S.C., Albany, New York, U.S.	
58	Loss	19–11–2 (26)	Lockport Jimmy Duffy	NWS	10	Apr 10, 1917	Broadway Auditorium, Buffalo, New York, U.S.	
57	Loss	19–11–2 (25)	Charley White	TKO	5 (12)	Jul 11, 1916	Boston, Massachusetts, U.S.	
56	Loss	19–10–2 (25)	Frankie Mack	NWS	10	Jun 9, 1916	Genesee Arena, Rochester, New York, U.S.	
55	Loss	19–10–2 (24)	Johnny Dundee	PTS	12	May 16, 1916	Armory, Boston, Massachusetts, U.S.	
54	Win	19–9–2 (24)	Eddie Murphy	PTS	12	Apr 18, 1916	Armory, Boston, Massachusetts, U.S.	
53	Loss	18–9–2 (24)	Charley White	PTS	15	Apr 6, 1916	Kansas City, Missouri, U.S.	
52	Loss	18–8–2 (24)	Charley White	NWS	10	Mar 20, 1916	Broadway A.C., Cincinnati, Ohio, U.S.	
51	Loss	18–8–2 (23)	Johnny Griffiths	NWS	12	Feb 29, 1916	Columbus, Ohio, U.S.	
50	Win	18–8–2 (22)	Charley White	PTS	12	Jan 4, 1916	Hippodrome, Boston, Massachusetts, U.S.	
49	Loss	17–8–2 (22)	Johnny Dundee	PTS	12	Dec 10, 1915	Italian Riverside Club, New Haven, Connecticut, U.S.	
48	Loss	17–7–2 (22)	Johnny Griffiths	NWS	12	Nov 29, 1915	Akron, Ohio, U.S.	
47	Loss	17–7–2 (21)	Steve Latzo	NWS	6	Nov 25, 1915	Olympia A.C., Philadelphia, Pennsylvania, U.S.	
46	Win	17–7–2 (20)	Young Abe Brown	NWS	10	Nov 19, 1915	Harlem S.C., New York City, New York, U.S.	
45	Win	17–7–2 (19)	Charley White	NWS	10	Oct 29, 1915	Auditorium, Milwaukee, Wisconsin, U.S.	
44	Win	17–7–2 (18)	Willie Schaefer	NWS	10	Aug 7, 1915	Fairmont A.C., Bronx, New York City, New York, U.S.	
43	Draw	17–7–2 (17)	Young Neil	NWS	10	Jul 13, 1915	Allentown, Pennsylvania, U.S.	
42	Loss	17–7–2 (16)	Mike Glover	PTS	12	Jun 1, 1915	Arena (Atlas A.A.), Boston, Massachusetts, U.S.	Lost world welterweight title
41	Loss	17–6–2 (16)	Johnny Basham	PTS	15	Mar 22, 1915	London Opera House, Kingsway, London, England	
40	Win	17–5–2 (16)	Gus Platts	PTS	15	Jan 21, 1915	Liverpool Stadium, Pudsey Street, Liverpool, Merseyside, England	
39	Win	16–5–2 (16)	Young Nipper	PTS	15	Oct 12, 1914	The Ring, Blackfriars Road, Southwark, London, England	
38	Win	15–5–2 (16)	Tom McCormick	PTS	20	Mar 21, 1914	Sydney Stadium, Sydney, Australia	Won Commonwealth, BBBofC British, and world welterweight titles
37	Win	14–5–2 (16)	Ray Bronson	TKO	7 (20)	Feb 28, 1914	Sydney Stadium, Sydney, New South Wales, Australia	
36	Loss	13–5–2 (16)	Herb McCoy	PTS	20	Jan 17, 1914	Sydney Stadium, Sydney, New South Wales, Australia	
35	Loss	13–4–2 (16)	Harry Stone	PTS	20	Nov 29, 1913	Sydney Stadium, Sydney, New South Wales, Australia	
34	Loss	13–3–2 (16)	Hughie Mehegan	PTS	20	Nov 3, 1913	West Melbourne Stadium, Melbourne, Victoria, Australia	For Australian lightweight title
33	Win	13–2–2 (16)	Owen Moran	PTS	20	Sep 27, 1913	Sydney Stadium, Sydney, New South Wales, Australia	
32	Win	12–2–2 (16)	Hughie Mehegan	PTS	20	Aug 9, 1913	Sydney Stadium, Sydney, New South Wales, Australia	
31	Win	11–2–2 (16)	Hughie Mehegan	PTS	20	Feb 24, 1913	National Sporting Club, Covent Garden, London, England	
30	Win	10–2–2 (16)	Johnny Basham	KO	7 (15)	Dec 26, 1912	Theatre, Swansea, Wales	
29	Loss	9–2–2 (16)	Freddie Welsh	PTS	20	Nov 11, 1912	National Sporting Club, Covent Garden, London, England	Lost IBU and NSC lightweight titles
28	Loss	9–1–2 (16)	Hughie Mehegan	DQ	14 (20)	Sep 16, 1912	National Sporting Club, Covent Garden, London, England	
27	Loss	9–0–2 (16)	Bobby Wilson	NWS	10	Jun 7, 1912	Oneida County A.A., Utica, New York, U.S.	
26	Win	9–0–2 (15)	Young Abe Brown	NWS	10	Jun 5, 1912	Royale A.C., Brooklyn, New York City, New York, U.S.	
25	Loss	9–0–2 (14)	Packey McFarland	NWS	10	Apr 26, 1912	Madison Square Garden, New York City, New York, U.S.	
24	Win	9–0–2 (13)	Billy Donovan	KO	5 (10)	Oct 5, 1911	Olympic B.C., Toronto, Ontario, Canada	Retained world lightweight title claim
23	Win	8–0–2 (13)	Abe Attell	NWS	10	Sep 20, 1911	Madison A.C., New York City, New York, U.S.	
22	Win	8–0–2 (12)	Knockout Brown	NWS	10	Aug 30, 1911	Madison Square Garden, New York City, New York, U.S.	
21	Win	8–0–2 (11)	Willie Moody	NWS	6	Jul 28, 1911	Fairhill S.C., Philadelphia, Pennsylvania, U.S.	
20	Win	8–0–2 (10)	Dick Hyland	NWS	10	Jul 19, 1911	Albany, New York, U.S.	
19	Win	8–0–2 (9)	Philadelphia Pal Moore	PTS	12	Jun 24, 1911	Armory A.A., Boston, Massachusetts, U.S.	
18	Win	7–0–2 (9)	Leach Cross	NWS	10	Jun 2, 1911	Harlem River Casino, New York City, New York, U.S.	
17	Win	7–0–2 (8)	Freddie Welsh	PTS	20	Feb 27, 1911	National Sporting Club, Covent Garden, London, England	Won IBU and NSC British lightweight titles
16	Win	6–0–2 (8)	Jimmy Howard	DQ	9 (10)	Sep 13, 1910	Fairmont A.C., Bronx, New York City, New York, U.S.	
15	Loss	5–0–2 (8)	Paddy Sullivan	NWS	10	Aug 8, 1910	Olympia Boxing Club, New York City, New York, U.S.	
13	Win	5–0–2 (6)	Johnny Dohan	NWS	10	Jul 19, 1910	Fairmont A.C., New York, U.S.	
12	Win	5–0–2 (5)	Nick Muller	NWS	8	Jul 8, 1910	Combine A.C., Yonkers, New York, U.S.	
11	Win	5–0–2 (4)	Billy Leary	NWS	10	Jul 5, 1910	Yonkers, New York, U.S.	
10	Win	5–0–2 (3)	Charley Lawrence	NWS	10	Jun 28, 1910	Fairmont A.C., New York City, New York, U.S.	
9	Win	5–0–2 (2)	Mark Anderson	NWS	10	May 25, 1910	Yonkers, New York, U.S.	
8	Win	5–0–2 (1)	Smiling Eddie Kelly	NWS	8	May 5, 1910	Combine A.C., Yonkers, New York, U.S.	
7	Draw	5–0–2	Young Nipper	PTS	6	Apr 14, 1910	King's Hall, London Road, Southwark, London, England	
6	Win	5–0–1	Jack Turner	PTS	20	Mar 14, 1910	Wonderland, Whitechapel Road, Mile End, London, England	
5	Win	4–0–1	Sid Stagg	PTS	10	Feb 19, 1910	Wonderland, Whitechapel Road, Mile End, London, England	
4	Draw	3–0–1	Dick Lee	PTS	6	Jan 10, 1910	The Empire, Holborn, London, England	
3	Win	3–0	Gunner Hart	PTS	6	Jan 1, 1910	Surrey Music Hall, Southwark, London, England	
2	Win	2–0	Bob Russell	PTS	10	Dec 20, 1909	The King's Hall, London Road, Walworth, England	
1	Win	1–0	Battling Lacroix	PTS	10	Nov 1, 1909	King's Hall, London Road, London, England	

=== Unofficial record ===
86 fights	51 wins	30 losses
By knockout	7	2
By decision	42	26
By disqualification	2	2
Draws	3	
No contests	2	

Record with the inclusion of newspaper decisions in the win/loss/draw column.

No.	Result	Record	Opponent	Type	Round	Date	Location	Notes
86	Win	51–30–3 (2)	Jack Hart	PTS	15	May 12, 1922	Premierland, Whitechapel, London, England	
85	Win	50–30–3 (2)	Stanley Glen	PTS	15	Apr 17, 1922	Tredegar Road Drill Hall, Bow, London, England	
84	Loss	49–30–3 (2)	Ted Moore	PTS	15	Dec 29, 1921	Premierland, Whitechapel, London, England	
83	Win	49–29–3 (2)	Clement Carlos	TKO	13 (15)	Oct 31, 1921	National Sporting Club, Covent Garden, London, England	
82	Loss	48–29–3 (2)	Seaman Nobby Hall	PTS	15	Aug 31, 1921	Cosmopolitan Gymnasium, Plymouth, Devon, England	
81	Win	48–28–3 (2)	Joe Davis	TKO	10 (15)	Dec 11, 1920	The Dome, Brighton, Sussex, England	
80	Win	47–28–3 (2)	Kid Plested	KO	6 (15)	Nov 27, 1920	Tyneside Stadium, Wallsend, Tyne and Wear, England	
79	Loss	46–28–3 (2)	Ted Moore	DQ	13 (20)	Aug 7, 1920	The Ring, Blackfriars Road, Southwark, London, England	
78	Win	46–27–3 (2)	Joe Attwood	TKO	5 (20)	Jun 26, 1920	The Ring, Blackfriars Road, Southwark, London, England	
77	Win	45–27–3 (2)	Gus Platts	PTS	20	Jun 12, 1920	Pheasant Inn Grounds, Carbrook, Yorkshire, England	
76	Win	44–27–3 (2)	Fred Newberry	PTS	20	Jun 4, 1920	The Peoples' Palace, Mile End, London, England	
75	Win	43–27–3 (2)	Bermondsey Billy Wells	DQ	15 (20)	May 8, 1920	The Ring, Blackfriars Road, Southwark, London, England	Billy Wells disqualified for butting Matt Wells in the stomach
74	Loss	42–27–3 (2)	Ted Moore	PTS	20	Apr 24, 1920	Palace Theatre, Plymouth, Devon, England	
73	Loss	42–26–3 (2)	Phil Bloom	PTS	15	Mar 18, 1920	Holborn Stadium, Holborn, London, England	
72	Loss	42–25–3 (2)	Ted Kid Lewis	RTD	12 (20)	Dec 26, 1919	Royal Albert Hall, Kensington, London, England	
71	Loss	42–24–3 (2)	Johnny Basham	PTS	20	Nov 13, 1919	Holborn Stadium, Holborn, London, England	For Commonwealth and BBBofC British welterweight titles
70	Win	42–23–3 (2)	Kid Carter	PTS	20	Oct 20, 1919	National Sporting Club, Covent Garden, London, England	
69	Win	41–23–3 (2)	Harlem Eddie Kelly	PTS	12	Oct 29, 1917	20th Century A.C., Pittsfield, Massachusetts, U.S.	
68	Win	40–23–3 (2)	Young Maxwell	DQ	4 (?)	Oct 9, 1917	Albany, New York, U.S.	Some sources have this has a TKO win in four for Wells while a few other sources have Wells losing by DQ in four
67	NC	39–23–3 (2)	Charley White	NC	9 (10)	Oct 5, 1917	Arena, Syracuse, New York, U.S.	Bout stopped due to stalling
66	Win	39–23–3 (1)	Frankie Nelson	NWS	10	Sep 28, 1917	Arena, Syracuse, New York, U.S.	
65	Loss	38–23–3 (1)	Bryan Downey	NWS	12	Sep 17, 1917	Coliseum, Columbus, Ohio, U.S.	
64	Loss	38–22–3 (1)	Bryan Downey	NWS	10	Aug 27, 1917	Airdome A.C., Rochester, New York, U.S.	
63	Win	38–21–3 (1)	Kid Curley	NWS	10	Jun 19, 1917	Urban Liberty Park, Buffalo, New York, U.S.	
62	Win	37–21–3 (1)	Phil Bloom	NWS	10	Jun 16, 1917	Broadway S.C., Brooklyn, New York City, New York, U.S.	
61	Win	36–21–3 (1)	Walter Mohr	NWS	10	Jun 11, 1917	Airdome A.C., Rochester, New York, U.S.	
60	Loss	35–21–3 (1)	Lockport Jimmy Duffy	PTS	10	May 25, 1917	Hamilton, Ontario, Canada	
59	Win	35–20–3 (1)	Walter Mohr	NWS	10	May 1, 1917	National S.C., Albany, New York, U.S.	
58	Loss	34–20–3 (1)	Lockport Jimmy Duffy	NWS	10	Apr 10, 1917	Broadway Auditorium, Buffalo, New York, U.S.	
57	Loss	34–19–3 (1)	Charley White	TKO	5 (12)	Jul 11, 1916	Boston, Massachusetts, U.S.	
56	Loss	34–18–3 (1)	Frankie Mack	NWS	10	Jun 9, 1916	Genesee Arena, Rochester, New York, U.S.	
55	Loss	34–17–3 (1)	Johnny Dundee	PTS	12	May 16, 1916	Armory, Boston, Massachusetts, U.S.	
54	Win	34–16–3 (1)	Eddie Murphy	PTS	12	Apr 18, 1916	Armory, Boston, Massachusetts, U.S.	
53	Loss	33–16–3 (1)	Charley White	PTS	15	Apr 6, 1916	Kansas City, Missouri, U.S.	
52	Loss	33–15–3 (1)	Charley White	NWS	10	Mar 20, 1916	Broadway A.C., Cincinnati, Ohio, U.S.	
51	Loss	33–14–3 (1)	Johnny Griffiths	NWS	12	Feb 29, 1916	Columbus, Ohio, U.S.	
50	Win	33–13–3 (1)	Charley White	PTS	12	Jan 4, 1916	Hippodrome, Boston, Massachusetts, U.S.	
49	Loss	32–13–3 (1)	Johnny Dundee	PTS	12	Dec 10, 1915	Italian Riverside Club, New Haven, Connecticut, U.S.	
48	Loss	32–12–3 (1)	Johnny Griffiths	NWS	12	Nov 29, 1915	Akron, Ohio, U.S.	
47	Loss	32–11–3 (1)	Steve Latzo	NWS	6	Nov 25, 1915	Olympia A.C., Philadelphia, Pennsylvania, U.S.	
46	Win	32–10–3 (1)	Young Abe Brown	NWS	10	Nov 19, 1915	Harlem S.C., New York City, New York, U.S.	
45	Win	31–10–3 (1)	Charley White	NWS	10	Oct 29, 1915	Auditorium, Milwaukee, Wisconsin, U.S.	
44	Win	30–10–3 (1)	Willie Schaefer	NWS	10	Aug 7, 1915	Fairmont A.C., Bronx, New York City, New York, U.S.	
43	Draw	29–10–3 (1)	Young Neil	NWS	10	Jul 13, 1915	Allentown, Pennsylvania, U.S.	
42	Loss	29–10–2 (1)	Mike Glover	PTS	12	Jun 1, 1915	Arena (Atlas A.A.), Boston, Massachusetts, U.S.	Lost world welterweight title
41	Loss	29–9–2 (1)	Johnny Basham	PTS	15	Mar 22, 1915	London Opera House, Kingsway, London, England	
40	Win	29–8–2 (1)	Gus Platts	PTS	15	Jan 21, 1915	Liverpool Stadium, Pudsey Street, Liverpool, Merseyside, England	
39	Win	28–8–2 (1)	Young Nipper	PTS	15	Oct 12, 1914	The Ring, Blackfriars Road, Southwark, London, England	
38	ND	27–8–2 (1)	George Mack	ND	4	Oct 5, 1914	Wellington Pier Pavilion, Great Yarmouth, England	
37	Win	27–8–2	Tom McCormick	PTS	20	Mar 21, 1914	Sydney Stadium, Sydney, Australia	Won Commonwealth, BBBofC British, and world welterweight titles
36	Win	26–8–2	Ray Bronson	TKO	7 (20)	Feb 28, 1914	Sydney Stadium, Sydney, New South Wales, Australia	
35	Loss	25–8–2	Herb McCoy	PTS	20	Jan 17, 1914	Sydney Stadium, Sydney, New South Wales, Australia	
34	Loss	25–7–2	Harry Stone	PTS	20	Nov 29, 1913	Sydney Stadium, Sydney, New South Wales, Australia	
33	Loss	25–6–2	Hughie Mehegan	PTS	20	Nov 3, 1913	West Melbourne Stadium, Melbourne, Victoria, Australia	For Australian lightweight title
32	Win	25–5–2	Owen Moran	PTS	20	Sep 27, 1913	Sydney Stadium, Sydney, New South Wales, Australia	
31	Win	24–5–2	Hughie Mehegan	PTS	20	Aug 9, 1913	Sydney Stadium, Sydney, New South Wales, Australia	
30	Win	23–5–2	Hughie Mehegan	PTS	20	Feb 24, 1913	National Sporting Club, Covent Garden, London, England	
29	Win	22–5–2	Johnny Basham	KO	7 (15)	Dec 26, 1912	Theatre, Swansea, Wales	
28	Loss	21–5–2	Freddie Welsh	PTS	20	Nov 11, 1912	National Sporting Club, Covent Garden, London, England	Lost IBU and NSC lightweight titles
27	Loss	21–4–2	Hughie Mehegan	DQ	14 (20)	Sep 16, 1912	National Sporting Club, Covent Garden, London, England	
26	Loss	21–3–2	Bobby Wilson	NWS	10	Jun 7, 1912	Oneida County A.A., Utica, New York, U.S.	
25	Win	21–2–2	Young Abe Brown	NWS	10	Jun 5, 1912	Royale A.C., Brooklyn, New York City, New York, U.S.	
24	Loss	20–2–2	Packey McFarland	NWS	10	Apr 26, 1912	Madison Square Garden, New York City, New York, U.S.	
23	Win	20–1–2	Billy Donovan	KO	5 (10)	Oct 5, 1911	Olympic B.C., Toronto, Ontario, Canada	Retained world lightweight title claim
22	Win	19–1–2	Abe Attell	NWS	10	Sep 20, 1911	Madison A.C., New York City, New York, U.S.	
21	Win	18–1–2	Knockout Brown	NWS	10	Aug 30, 1911	Madison Square Garden, New York City, New York, U.S.	
20	Win	17–1–2	Willie Moody	NWS	6	Jul 28, 1911	Fairhill S.C., Philadelphia, Pennsylvania, U.S.	
19	Win	16–1–2	Dick Hyland	NWS	10	Jul 19, 1911	Albany, New York, U.S.	
18	Win	15–1–2	Philadelphia Pal Moore	PTS	12	Jun 24, 1911	Armory A.A., Boston, Massachusetts, U.S.	
17	Win	14–1–2	Leach Cross	NWS	10	Jun 2, 1911	Harlem River Casino, New York City, New York, U.S.	
16	Win	13–1–2	Freddie Welsh	PTS	20	Feb 27, 1911	National Sporting Club, Covent Garden, London, England	Won IBU and NSC British lightweight titles
15	Win	12–1–2	Jimmy Howard	DQ	9 (10)	Sep 13, 1910	Fairmont A.C., Bronx, New York City, New York, U.S.	
14	Loss	11–1–2	Paddy Sullivan	NWS	10	Aug 8, 1910	Olympia Boxing Club, New York City, New York, U.S.	
13	Win	11–0–2	Johnny Dohan	NWS	10	Jul 19, 1910	Fairmont A.C., New York, U.S.	
12	Win	10–0–2	Nick Muller	NWS	8	Jul 8, 1910	Combine A.C., Yonkers, New York, U.S.	
11	Win	9–0–2	Billy Leary	NWS	10	Jul 5, 1910	Yonkers, New York, U.S.	
10	Win	8–0–2	Charley Lawrence	NWS	10	Jun 28, 1910	Fairmont A.C., New York City, New York, U.S.	
9	Win	7–0–2	Mark Anderson	NWS	10	May 25, 1910	Yonkers, New York, U.S.	
8	Win	6–0–2	Smiling Eddie Kelly	NWS	8	May 5, 1910	Combine A.C., Yonkers, New York, U.S.	
7	Draw	5–0–2	Young Nipper	PTS	6	Apr 14, 1910	King's Hall, London Road, Southwark, London, England	
6	Win	5–0–1	Jack Turner	PTS	20	Mar 14, 1910	Wonderland, Whitechapel Road, Mile End, London, England	
5	Win	4–0–1	Sid Stagg	PTS	10	Feb 19, 1910	Wonderland, Whitechapel Road, Mile End, London, England	
4	Draw	3–0–1	Dick Lee	PTS	6	Jan 10, 1910	The Empire, Holborn, London, England	
3	Win	3–0	Gunner Hart	PTS	6	Jan 1, 1910	Surrey Music Hall, Southwark, London, England	
2	Win	2–0	Bob Russell	PTS	10	Dec 20, 1909	The King's Hall, London Road, Walworth, England	
1	Win	1–0	Battling Lacroix	PTS	10	Nov 1, 1909	King's Hall, London Road, London, England	

== See also ==
- Lineal championship
- List of welterweight boxing champions
- List of British welterweight boxing champions
- List of British lightweight boxing champions

== Major titles ==
Achievements
Preceded by Freddie Welsh	British lightweight championship 27 February 1911 – 11 November 1912	Succeeded by Freddie Welsh
Preceded by Tom McCormick	British welterweight championship 21 March 1914; Vacated	Vacant Title next held by Johnny Basham
Preceded by Tom McCormick	World Welterweight Champion; 21 March 1914 – 1 June 1915	Succeeded by Mike Glover
