= Llew Edwards =

Llew Edwards may refer to:

- Llew Edwards (boxer)
- Llew Edwards (politician)
