= Harry Stone =

American boxer (1893–1950)

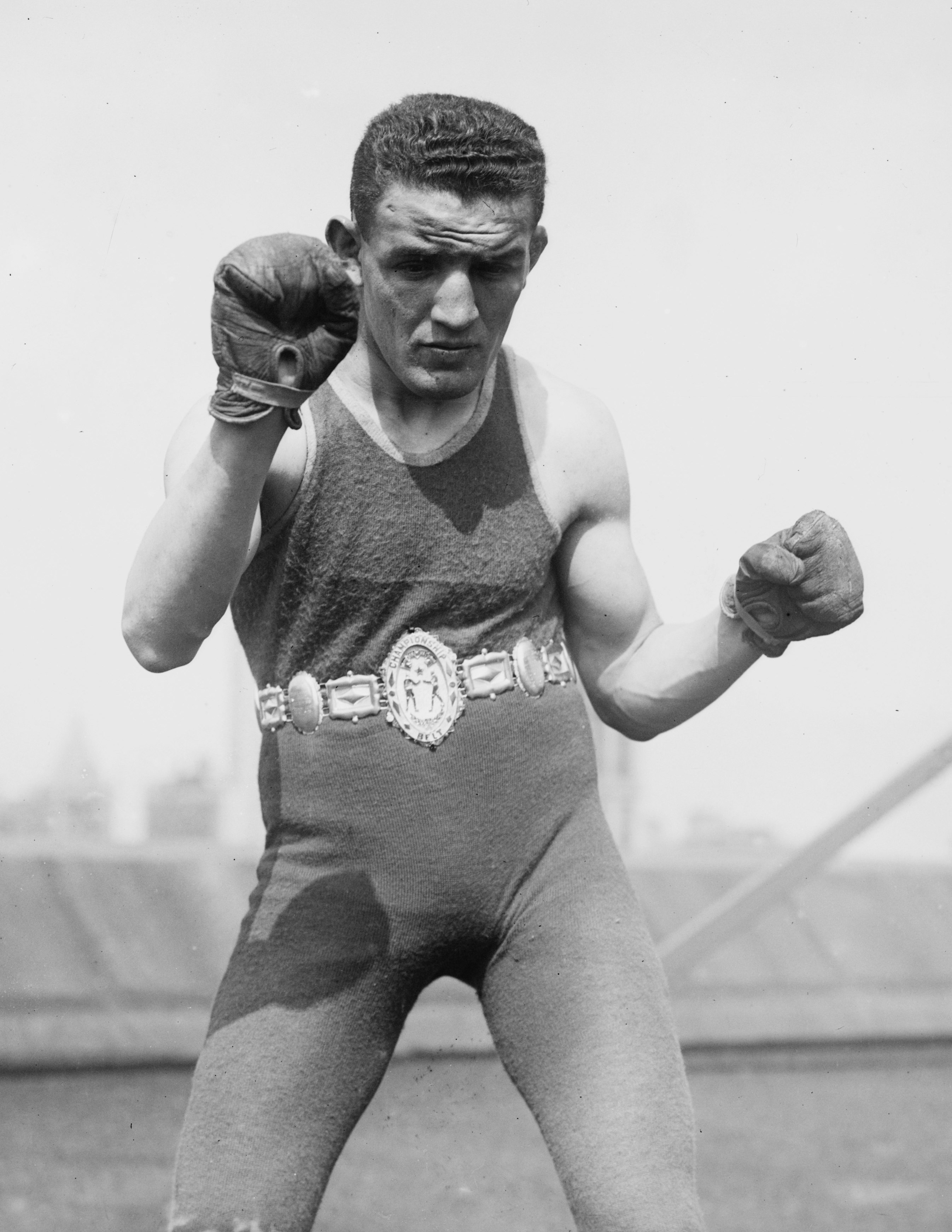
- Harry Stone in 1910

Personal information
- Nickname: Hop Harry
- Nationality: American
- Born: Harry Seifstein; March 4, 1893 New York, New York
- Died: December 12, 1950 (aged 57) Marrickville, Sydney, Australia
- Height: 5 ft 7.5 in (171 cm)
- Weight: Lightweight, welterweight

Boxing career
- Reach: 69.5 in (177 cm)
- Stance: Orthodox

Boxing record
- Total fights: 150
- Wins: 82
- Win by KO: 17
- Losses: 42
- Draws: 18
- No contests: 3

Harry Stone (March 4, 1893 – December 13, 1950), born Harry Seifstein and nicknamed Hop Harry Stone, was an American boxer who competed primarily in Australia. Stone's nickname of "Hop Harry" originated from a fight against Tommy Uren in which he employed a hopping motion that resembled the movement of a kangaroo. He would become known for using this technique in his subsequent fights, as a trademark and in a small part to entertain his audience. He had an effective left jab which became another signature trait.

Stone's recorded fights number only around 150 from statistical site BoxRec, but he is one of only two boxers recognized to have fought over 200 bouts without being knocked out or stopped, a feat equaled only by Jewish boxer Benny Valgar. He was inducted into the Australian National Boxing Hall of Fame in 2013 as an honorary international for making a major contribution to Australian boxing.

Stone competed early in his career in the lightweight class, but competed in the welterweight and middleweight divisions in his later years. He held both the Australian lightweight and welterweight title for several years. Though detailed records may no longer exist, it is estimated he amassed over 500 bouts throughout his career, and claimed to have never been knocked out or knocked down in any of them.

== Early life and background ==
Stone was born Harry Seifstein to Jewish parents on the New York City's Lower East Side, and grew up in poverty in a family of eight. He is believed to have been the earliest Jewish boxer to wear a tallis or prayer shawl into the ring, a feat that pleased his partially Jewish audience.

In need of money, Stone began working as a newspaper boy in the Bowery at the age of 11, first selling papers near Tom Sharkey's bar on West 67th, and later in the Tenderloin district in lower Manhattan. When Stone started this job, he could only speak Yiddish. Other newspaper boys called him "Kid Starr" because they could not pronounce his last name of Seifstein. Harry's boss at the newspaper incorrectly transcribed his name as Stone instead of Starr, which led him to adopt Stone as his permanent ring name.

== Early boxing career in the United States, 1909-12 ==
Stone's most frequent opponents were Fred Kay and Tommy Uren, whom he met a total of 19 times in Australia.

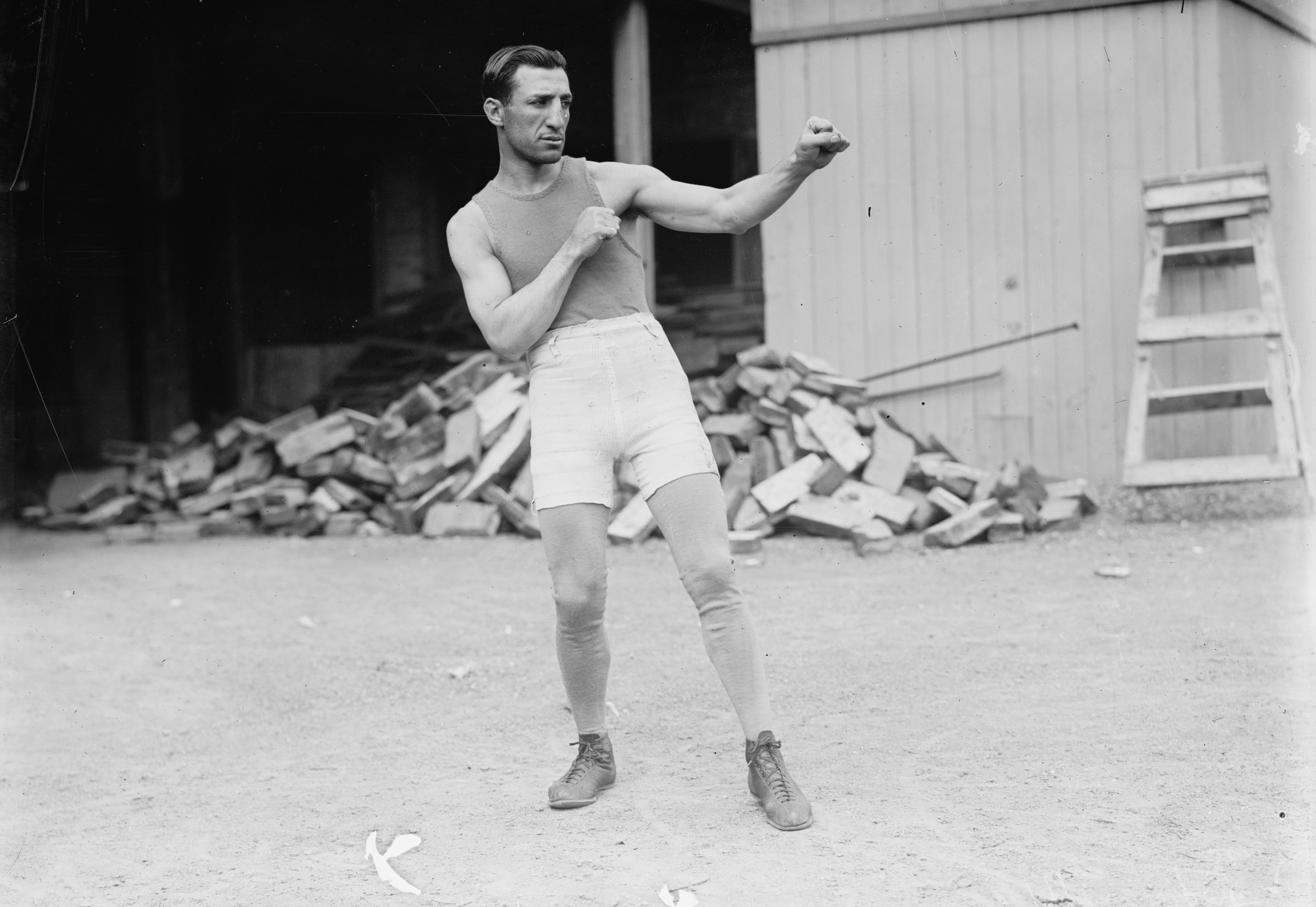
Attell, Featherweight Champ

On August 18, 1909, only three years into his career, Stone fought a competitive, ten round no title and no decision bout in Saratoga, New York, against the reigning world featherweight champion, Abe Attell. Attell was arguably the greatest Jewish featherweight of the era, and credited with holding the world featherweight championship for eight years at the turn of the century. Attell won by the accounts of most newspapers, but the San Francisco Call, said Stone showed promise and "came with a rush that earned him a draw". In his last few years as a boxer, Attell would tarnish a great career arousing suspicions of fixing fights, and playing a part in the fixing of the 1919 World Series with the Chicago White Sox.

=== Bouts with Terry McGraw and champion Jack Britton ===
Stone took an important early win in a slow and deliberate twenty round points decision against Terry McGraw on October 4, 1909, in Baltimore. Though the win looked decisive to the referees, the fighting was close, and both boxers scored frequently with blows. Stone's blows did not quite have the steam of McGraw's, but they landed more frequently. Both boxers did well in the infighting, but Stone showed a greater ability to parry blows and to take the lead in the fighting.

Two months later, on October 28, 1909, Stone fought a fifteen-round draw with Leach Cross, an exceptional Jewish lightweight, known as "The Fighting Dentist". The bout was considered tame and dull by many of those present, and Cross was warned by referee Joe Gans to make more of an effort to fight. After the eighth round, Stone became the aggressor and landed often to both the chest and face. Cross countered with blows, but reporters considered his and Stone's blows to lack steam. In the tenth, the referee was again forced to break the boxers from a clinch and encourage them to trade blows. There were no knockdowns in the bout.

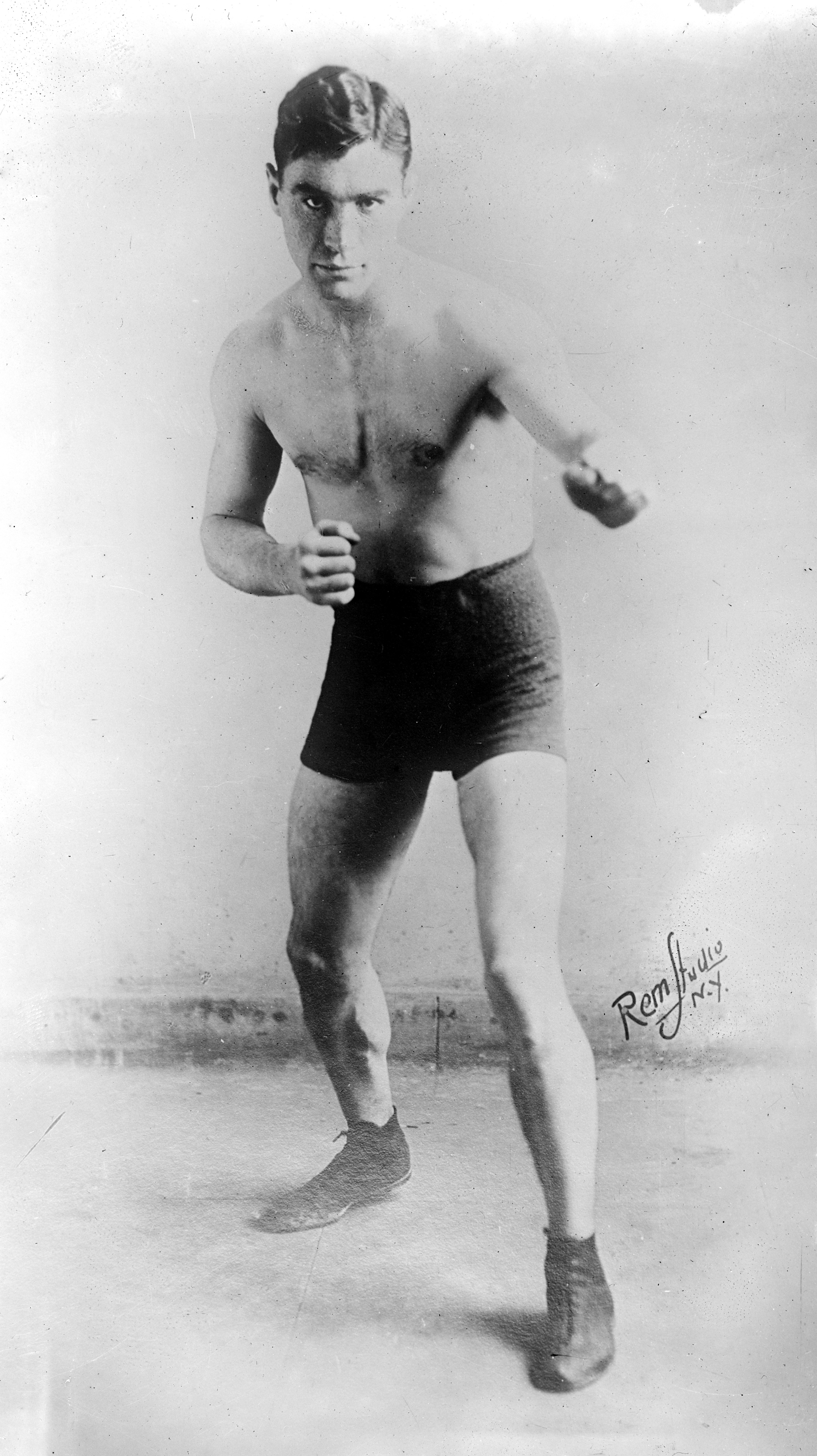
Jack Britton

Facing his best known opponent on November 29, 1909, Stone fought Hall of Famer, and future world welterweight champion Jack Britton, losing a six-round newspaper decision. He would meet Britton again on July 17, 1912, and lose once more in a ten-round newspaper decision in New York's St. Nicholas Arena. Britton won easily, and had Stone groggy in the seventh from a right to the jaw, but the bell saved Stone. Though able to take the punishment offered by Britton, and mount his own fierce attack at times, Stone took only the fourth round according to one reporter. Britton was not assessed as fighting at his best in the bout, but Stone was credited for remaining on his feet throughout the bout, and putting up enough of a defense to avoid a knockdown. Once again, Stone made contact with his left jab, a signature blow in many of his bouts. His inability to climb his way to the top in the competitive New York boxing world, soon spurred Stone to consider the larger crowds and bigger purses in Australia.

Stone lost to Dick Nelson on January 11, 1910, in Lymansville, Road Island in a well publicized 15 round points decision. Nelson took the fight to Stone in every round, but Stone made an excellent showing and several ringside thought he deserved a draw for his efforts. Nelson was a well-rated lightweight who met future welterweight champions Harry Lewis and the Dixie kid that year.

On September 26, 1911, Stone lost a ten-round newspaper decision to well known lightweight Young Nichie at New York's Twentieth Century Athletic Club. Stone had a slight advantage in reach but gave up about ten pounds in weight, which may have been the deciding factor in the close match.

In one of his best publicized early bouts on January 18, 1912, Stone lost to Battling Gates at the Luzerne Theater in Wilkes-Barre, Pennsylvania. Losing by only a shade in an action packed six rounds, he attempted to put Gates away early but met his match in his skilled opponent's counter-attack. Gates was able to parry and duck the powerful blows dealt by Stone at long range, but in infighting, Gates carelessly took punishment from the longer reach of Stone, who scored frequently at close range. Gates appeared to do the better fighting in the first five rounds, but Stone had strength enough left to take the sixth. He was described accurately by the Wilkes-Barre Record as being one of the best at his weight in the world.

Stone defeated high rated fringe lightweight contender Joe Thomas on April 1, 1912, in what was arranged to be a draw in New Orleans, Louisiana. Stone's victory put him in line to face Frank Russell for a second time in a bout that would end in another draw, but on points.

Though he had a ten-pound weight advantage, Stone lost to featherweight Joe Shugrue on August 26, 1912, in a rare match in New York's historic Madison Square Garden. In what was frequently a fast fight, Shugrue shone as the aggressor and threw more and better placed punches. On occasion, fighting toe to toe, the combatants would throw caution to the wind, and fight with little science or technique. Shugrue would become an exceptional lightweight who fought many of the greatest lightweights of his era including Ted Kid Lewis, and Johnny Dundee.

== First trip to Australia to box ==
=== Defeating British ex-lightweight champion Mat Wells, 1913 ===
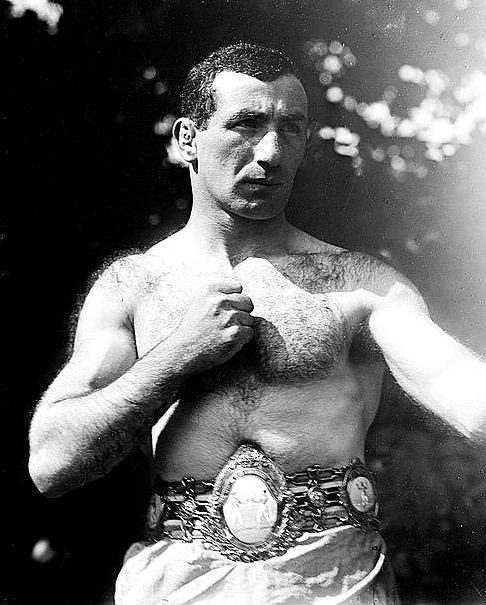
Mat Wells with belt

On November 29, 1913, at the age of only twenty, Stone defeated the former English lightweight and future world welterweight champion Matt Wells before an impressive crowd of 12,000 in a fifteen-round points decision in Sydney. In 1911, Wells had become the first Jewish lightweight champion of Great Britain, and taken the Lonsdale belt. The decision for Stone was a popular one and he was said to have boxed brilliantly and kept the crowd on their feet. Though outweighed by four pounds, Stone finished the bout stronger than his opponent. The fight was even in most regards throughout but Wells was cautioned for questionable tactics at many points in the bout. Many considered the victory Stone's most impressive early career win and an indication of future promise.

=== Defeating British welter champ Johnny Summers ===
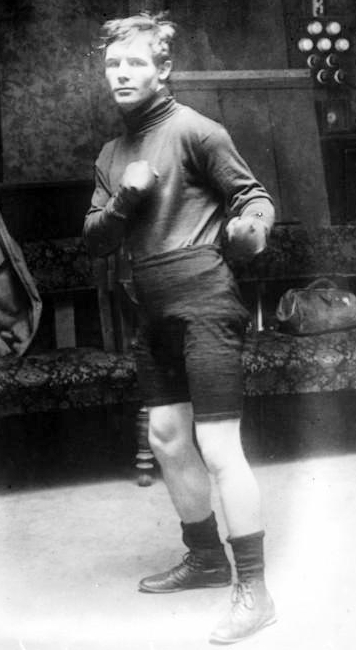
Johnny Summers, 1909

While still only twenty, Stone defeated the reigning 1912 BBofC and NSC British welterweight champion Johnny Summers on May 18, 1913, in a non-title twenty round points decision at Olympic Stadium in Brisbane, Australia. Though less experienced and six years younger, he was considered by most reporters to have outpointed Summers in nearly every round. In September, Stone defeated Summers again in a twenty-round points decision in Sydney. Stone later said of his second win against Summers, that he looked back on the fight as the "greatest of all his Sydney encounters". Assessing Summers' skills, Stone wrote "He was a fighter with a world-wide reputation, and he had a wallop that would stop any clowning if he landed it, but his speed was not comparable to mine". He later fought Summers to a twenty-round draw in Kensington, England on June 13, 1914, in a bout that was billed as a world welterweight championship, though the draw ruling prevented Summers from taking the title. Summers started with great speed and attacked fiercely while Stone clinched to avoid punishment. In the sixth, Stone rallied and got in some punishing body blows. After the eighth, Summer's pace slackened, and Stone blocked his leads more effectively. Many in the crowd believed that Stone had defeated Summers by a large margin, but may have been hampered by the bias of the hometown judges.

On December 13, 1913, Stone defeated Pal Brown, one of his most skilled opponents, at the Olympia Athletic Club in Sydney, Australia in a twenty-round points decision. Stone wrote of Brown that "He was clever; his punches had a snap in them that hurt". Stone claimed to defeat Brown he had to dispense with his hopping tactic and keep both feet planted firmly on the ground. Brown, an American from Minnesota, did well in Australia defeating the Australian lightweight champion Hughie Mehegan.

Abe "The Newsboy" Hollandersky, claimed to have sparred with Stone for a few rounds around 1911–14. Both were New York Jewish welterweights who worked as newsboys, frequented Tom Sharkey's bar and boxing studio, boxed over 200 bouts, and had a few of the same boxing opponents. Stone delivered papers near Sharkey's in his youth, and boxed there a few times as well.

== Brief boxing tour in London, 1914 ==
Stone had an important early win against Ed Beattie on May 14, 1914, in Liverpool, England winning easily in a twenty-round points decision. Beattie was a well known Scottish boxer with a slight advantage in height, who attracted a good crowd in Liverpool.

=== Loss to British lightweight Jerry Delaney ===
In a twenty-round points decision on June 15, 1914, Stone lost to the exceptional British lightweight Jerry Delaney before a sizable crowd in the National Sporting Club in Covent Garden, England. After his wins over Mat Wells and Johnny Summers, Stone was viewed as a top contender for the British lightweight championship. The National Sporting Club was the most prestigious venue for sports events in London and this bout was the main event. A known quantity, Delaney had competed in an elimination tournament for the British lightweight title in March 1914. Delaney was known to have a great deal of power in both fists, and was predicted to win the bout by the London Times, though Stone had a slight lead in the early betting. In the contest, Delaney easily outpointed Stone, scoring frequently throughout the bout, particularly with his left. It was only the skilled dodging, bobbing, and slipping punches employed by Stone that allowed him to last through the long match, but he was known well for his skills at ringcraft. The purse for the well attended bout was 700 British pounds.

== Return to the United States to box ==
On September 8, 1914, Stone lost to the talented Jewish New York lightweight and fringe contender Phil Bloom in a ten-round newspaper decision in Brooklyn. Bloom dominated the first six rounds and landed his left jab well in the second, despite the skills of Stone, who many reporters recognized as a serious world welterweight contender on the fringe. The seventh saw both boxers jabbing and dancing away, and though the eighth and ninth were dull, the tenth saw both boxers mixing it up frequently, particularly Stone. Stone's efforts in the tenth were not sufficient to give him the decision as he had trailed behind in points through most of the opening rounds. A fight broke out among the spectators after the match that spread outside and required police intervention. Bloom won, in the opinion of the Brooklyn Daily Eagle by a shade, but many in the crowd considered the efforts of both boxers to be minimal.

Stone defeated Gilbert Gallant on December 1, 1914, in a twelve-round points decision in Boston in what could be described as an upset. His victory over the Canadian-born Boston lightweight in a close match surprised both Stone and the audience. His win was an upset locally as the early betting was 2–1 in favor of Gallant. With a three-inch advantage in height and a slight advantage in reach, Stone stayed in close in the fighting, refusing Gallant a lead in, and in the fifth, ninth, and twelfth rounds Stone bewildered Gallant with a series of lefts and rights to the head. Boston boxer Gallant would fight against many of the best fringe contenders of his era, including Charley White, Phil Bloom, and Frankie Callahan. The referee, Patsy Haley, was a former lightweight contender and would referee many of the greatest New York area matches of the 1930s.

On February 22, 1915, Stone defeated Lockport Jimmy Duffy at Broadway Auditorium in Buffalo, New York, losing in a ten-round newspaper decision. Duffy won convincingly, gaining points in each round. Stone's left bothered Duffy for a few rounds, but he was battered by Duffy despite great defensive work on his part. The Buffalo Enquirer wrote that Duffy "pelted, pecked, jabbed and slashed, at Stone who had an exceedingly clever and rather tantalizing manner of covering up, leaning half way out of the ring", but Stone "hardly hit Duffy a blow". The ten rounds were described as dull and unexciting.

Kid Graves, an important opponent, may have just outpointed Stone in a ten-round newspaper draw in Brooklyn on April 24, 1915. Graves had six of the ten rounds in his favor, according to one reporter, and was a top welterweight who considered himself the unsanctioned welterweight champion.

In an important early fight against a highly rated opponent, Stone defeated Frankie Russell before at crowd of 3000, in an eighteenth round disqualification in New Orleans on January 17, 1916. Russell seemed bewildered by Stone's defense and had been warned against fouling Stone by the referee in previous rounds. Stone hit Russell with repeated left jabs throughout the match, and though many were returned fairly, Russell appeared to be fouling Stone in frustration. Stone frequently locked Russell in clinches during the match. Russell was badly beaten in the fight and had been called for head butting in the final foul in the eighteenth. The win was a slight upset for Stone, as Russell was a 6-5 favorite in the early betting, but most ringside believed Stone took every round. Stone had lost to Russell previously.

=== Claiming a world welterweight title 1914-16 ===
According to British boxing historian Barry Wells, Stone claimed the world welterweight championship between 1914 and 1916, but the title was not sanctioned by a global body, as it would be later.

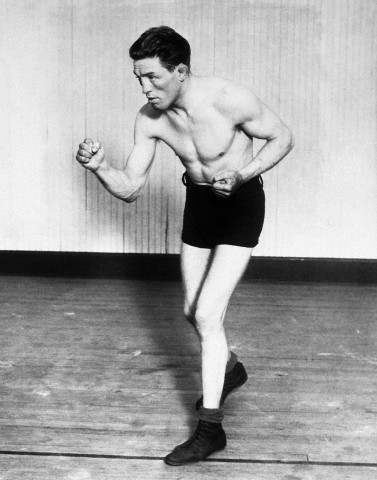
Ted "Kid" Lewis

Before a modest crowd of 2000, Stone lost any claim to the world welterweight title on March 1, 1916, to fellow Jewish boxer, London-born Brit Ted "Kid" Lewis, in a twenty-round one-sided thriller in New Orleans. The fight was fast and furious with few pauses in the action, and both boxers were considered to be in relatively good condition at the end. Lewis was described as the aggressor throughout the match, and considered by most sources to have clearly been the better boxer. The victor won fifteen and as many as eighteen rounds of the battle and Stone avoided being knocked out several times only by the use of skillful ducking and side-stepping. In the six rounds credited to Stone, the New York boxer blocked Lewis's blows and briefly appeared ready to assume the offensive. Lewis, who had a very slight advantage of three pounds in weight and even slighter advantage in height, did not appear to be in danger in any time during the fight. Lasting through the bout, Lewis was at his best in the last four rounds, which weighed heavily in the judges's decision. As testament, to the validity of Stone's world welterweight title claim, Lewis laid claim to the title after his victory over Stone, but many felt Briton or other welterweights had an equally valid claim to the title. The referees officially gave Lewis eleven rounds, Stone six, and declared three even. Lewis would later be rated by the statistical boxing website Boxrec as the seventeenth best welterweight of all time.

== Return to Australia to take two titles, 1916 ==
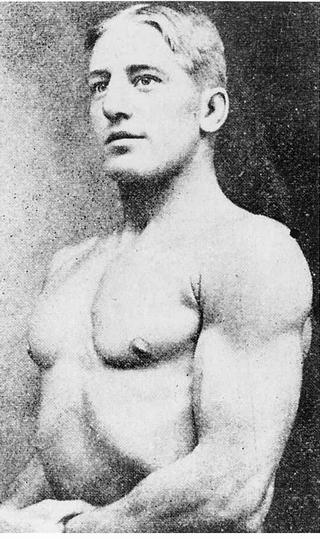
A young R.L. Baker

Former Australian boxer and Olympian R. L. "Snowy" Baker was the promoter who brought Stone to Australia, where he arrived in 1916 to box and defeat Herb "Kid" McCoy on April 22, Easter Saturday, in a twenty-round points decision at Sydney Stadium. Stone won using all his eccentric tricks to evade and confuse McCoy, but after his long voyage, he did not seem quite up to form.

Later in Brisbane on April 29, Stone defeated French boxer Ferdnand Quendreux in nearly all of his twenty-round decision on points, as his opponent could do little to stop him.

Stone remained in Australia nearly the rest of his life, taking only a brief boxing tour of the Philippines in 1926, and the United States between 1927 and 1928.

In a bout with a top Australian lightweight contender on June 9, 1919, Stone defeated Herb "Kid" McCoy in Adelaide, Australia, in a match that was stopped in the twelfth round. He would defeat Alf Morey for the resident Australian lightweight title on September 22, 1919, in a twenty-round points decision. Boxing historians credited neither of these wins as Stone's official conquest of the lightweight title, but they helped him gain his welterweight title shot in 1920, and his lightweight title shot the following year.

=== Taking Australian welter title, 1920 ===
Stone won the Australian welterweight title on July 27, 1920, in an impressive twenty round points decision against Fred Kay. Kay attributed his loss to the cold weather in Australia. Stone defeated Kay again in August in Perth, Australia in a 20-round rematch. On December 27, 1924, Stone lost the West Australian state welterweight title to native Eddie Young Butcher in a twenty-round points decision in Perth, which greatly diminished his claim to the title. Butcher would take the official title in December 1925.

=== Winning Australian light title, 1921 ===
In what was likely his greatest victory, Stone won the Australian lightweight title before an impressive crowd of 9000 on April 23, 1921, in a twenty-round bout in Melbourne, Australia, against Welshman Llew Edwards. The fight was described as an outstanding show of scientific boxing with both boxers well matched. Edwards seemed to look tired and a bit haggard during the bout, and suffered from a cut over his eye received in the fifth, though he fought with vitality and strength. Edwards had the disadvantage of protecting his eye, which reduced his ability to take the offensive, particularly against Stone's left. Stone gained the advantage and was said to have his "hands, feet, and shoulders all working, while the manner in which he bore into his opponent was both interesting and effective". In the seventh, Edwards punished Edward's body against the ropes early in the bout and did better in the infighting, but Stone threw more punches. As late as the eleventh and thirteenth, Edwards landed a few telling blows, but Stone remained in calculated command, and landed more blows. Edwards needed stitches to lacerations in both eyelids later in his dressing room, but his right seemed to have taken the most punishment. The boxers received around 350 English pounds for their efforts. Edwards had previously taken both the British and the British Empire featherweight titles in 1915.

=== Losing Australian light title, 1921 ===
Stone lost the title later that year on August 20, 1921, in a well publicized twenty-round decision before a capacity house against Sid Godfrey in Sydney Stadium. Stone, an early favorite at 7–4, could not land a well placed punch against Godfrey, who forced the pace and landed blows more cleanly. The champion took the largest purse of his career, and looked the easy victor by the third round. Godfrey had previously been Australian featherweight champion, and became the first Australian to take the lightweight title in seven years. Stone would lose to Godfrey again in a disappointing rematch for the title in twenty rounds at West Melbourne Stadium on September 31, 1922. At 29, Stone was outmatched by the 25 year old Godfrey, who had the skill to adapt to Stone's rapidly changing boxing styles and fight through him, using better technique and ringcraft.

Stone remained in Australia for the next ten years, having over 100 fights.

On February 18, 1922, Stone again defeated Llew Edwards in a fight at West Melbourne Stadium discontinued in the seventh round when Edwards's handlers were forced to throw in the towel, as their boxer had been completely outclassed. Edwards' manager claimed that his boxer's eyesight may have failed him.

Stone took the Western District of New South Wales welterweight title in a bout that was stopped in the eighth round on September 27, 1924, at Broken Hill, New South Wales, and retained the title in an eleventh round disqualification against Eddie Young Butcher on October 4, 1924, at the same ring. On May 8, 1926, in an important and widely publicized bout, Stone lost to Australian great Stan Craig of New South Wales in a twenty-round points decision in New Castle, Australia.

One of his better known losses was against World Boxing Hall of Famer Ceferino Garcia, a 1939 world middleweight champion, in a twelve-round points decision in the Philippines on September 4, 1926. Garcia would also contend for the welterweight championship against Barney Ross in 1937.

Continuing to fight in middle age, in the last two months of his career, at age 40, he fought three twenty round bouts just five weeks apart.

== Life outside boxing and retirement ==
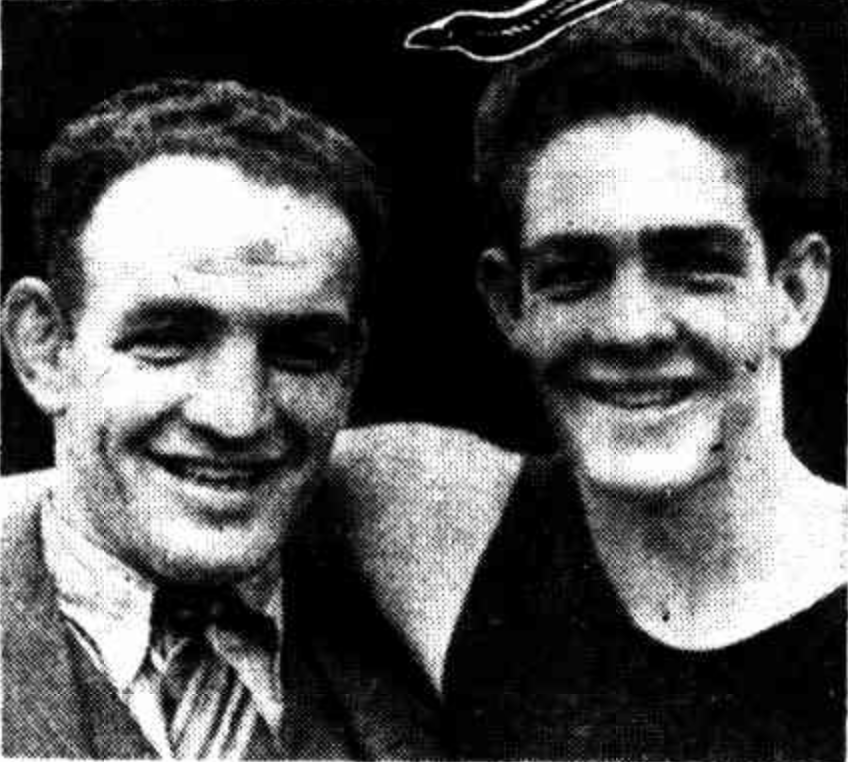
Stone with son

Stone was considered a fistic clown at times, and besides smoking a cigar in training he once chased a train to advertise a bout. To gain the attention of road workers who might be future fans, he would take a pick and work for an hour as a member of the crew.

He fought in World War I, and was falsely reported dead during the war, when he actually had broken an ankle in a minor ship accident.

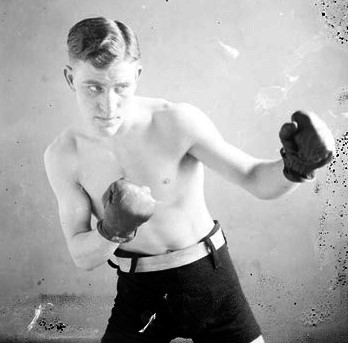
Dave Shade

He retired from boxing after his last fight in Australia around 1929, married a local girl and remained there the rest of his life. He had two sons, Robert and Max. In 1935, he ran a gymnasium in Newtown, Sydney, Australia and mentored the American boxer Dave Shade. He later managed Rus Critcher, a future Australian Welterweight champion. For many years he owned and operated a garage in Sydney, near his home in Marrickville.

His older of two sons, Max, served in the Australian army and had a career as an amateur boxer. Max was in consideration to represent Australian boxing at the 1936 Summer Olympics, but was not selected.

Stone died on December 12, 1950, in Australia's Sydney suburb of Marrickville and was cremated after a service at his home on December 14.
