= Packy =

Packy or Packie may refer to:

== People ==
- Packy Axton (1941–1974), American rhythm and blues tenor saxophone player and bandleader
- Packie Bonner (born 1960), former football goalkeeper for the Republic of Ireland
- Packy Campbell, American politician
- Packie Duignan (1922–1992), Irish flute player
- Packy East, boxing ring name of comedian Bob Hope (1903–2003)
- Packy Hyland Jr., founder of Hyland Software in 1991
- Pat McAllister (born 1972), Northern Irish football manager and former player
- Pascal McConnell (born 1980), former Gaelic football goalkeeper
- Packey McFarland (1888–1936), Irish-American boxer
- Packy McGarty (1933–2021), Gaelic football player
- Packy Naughton (born 1996), American baseball player
- Packie Nelson (1907–1992), American football player
- Packie Russell (1920–1977), Irish musician and storyteller
- Henry A. Schade (1900–1992), US Navy commodore, naval architect and professor
- Packy Dillon (1853-1902), American professional baseball player

== Fictional characters ==
- Packy, in the Sony PlayStation game Puzzle Bobble 4
- Packy Franklyn, protagonist of the 1932 novel Hot Water by P.G. Wodehouse
- Patrick "Packie" McReary, in the video game Grand Theft Auto IV

== Other uses ==
- Packy (elephant) (1962–2017), an elephant born in captivity
- packie, a slang term for a "package (liquor) store" in Massachusetts - see American English regional vocabulary

== See also ==
- Paki, British and Canadian ethnic slur for a Pakistani person
