= Ralph Pake =

English footballer

Personal information
- Full name: Ralph Robinson Pake
- Place of birth: Tynemouth, England
- Height: 5 ft 9 in (1.75 m)
- Position: Centre forward

Senior career*
Years	Team	Apps	(Gls)
1931–1935	Percy Main Amateurs	0	(0)
1935–1936	Newcastle United	0	(0)
1936–1937	Burnley	5	(1)
- * Club domestic league appearances and goals

Ralph Robinson Pake was an English professional footballer who played as a centre forward.
