= Packey McFarland =

American boxer (1888–1936)

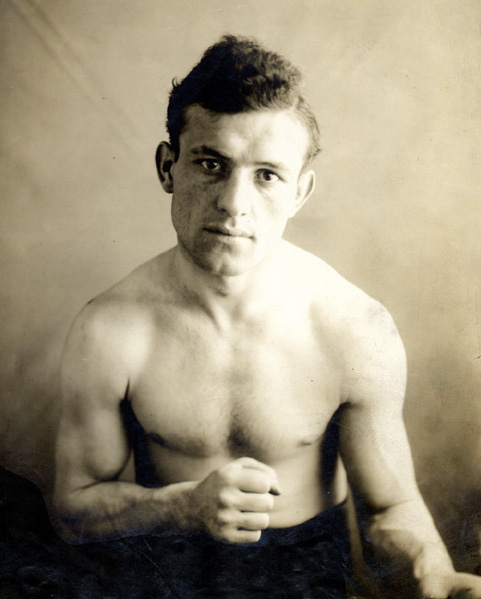

Personal information
- Born: Patrick McFarland; November 1, 1888 Chicago, Illinois, United States
- Died: September 22, 1936 (aged 47) Joliet, Illinois, United States
- Height: 5 ft 7 in (1.70 m)
- Weight: Lightweight; Welterweight

Boxing career
- Reach: 69 in (175 cm)

Boxing record
- Total fights: 113
- Wins: 106
- Win by KO: 50
- Losses: 1
- Draws: 6

Patrick McFarland (November 1, 1888 – September 22, 1936), nicknamed "Packey" or "Packy", was an American boxer in the lightweight and welterweight divisions. Despite an extraordinary winning record, he was unable to secure a match for either world title. The Ring Record Book and Boxing Encyclopedia as of 1936 "suggests" McFarland was the best fighter never to become a world champion.

== Professional career ==
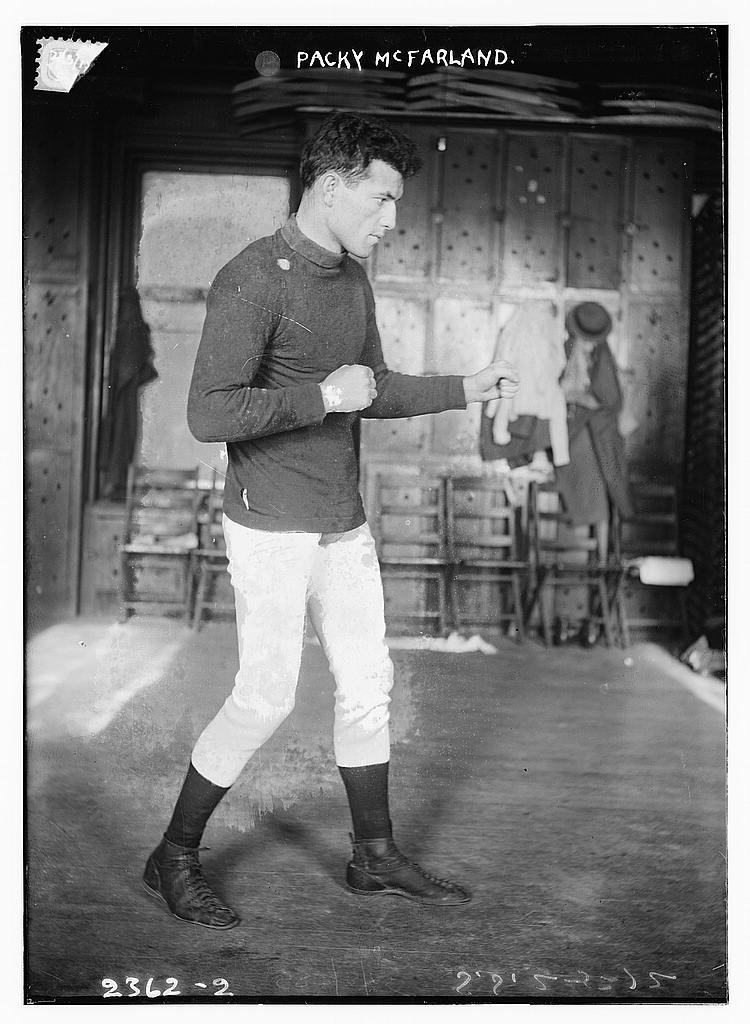
McFarland circa 1912

McFarland was born on November 1, 1888, in Chicago, Illinois. McFarland became a professional boxer on January 1, 1904 at the age of 15 by defeating Pete West.

On January 14, 1908 McFarland won a decision victory in Boston over Bert Keyes that helped establish him on the East Coast. On February 21, 1908 he won a 10-round decision victory in Milwaukee over future lightweight champion Freddie Welsh that began his famous rivalry with the Welsh wizard.

On April 11, 1908 he beat Jimmy Britt, who had a disputed claim to be the lightweight world champion, although this fight was not for a title. It was a career-defining performance where McFarland scientifically knocked out the former world lightweight champion in the 6th round in Colma, California.

On July 4, 1908 fought Freddie Welsh again in a 25-round draw in Los Angeles, in a fight described as one of the fastest lightweight bouts ever witnessed. On August 7, 1908 he defeated Phil Brock in a knockout victory in the 7th round in Los Angeles.

On March 30, 1909 fought Dave Deshler to controversial 12-round draw in Boston. McFarland was so upset by the decision he struck the referee and a cornerman. On May 30, 1910 fought to a draw with Freddie Welsh. It was their third and final meeting, a 20-round bout at the National Sporting Club in London. Most observers believed McFarland clearly won, but the referee scored a controversial draw. The bout was for British recognition of the world lightweight title. McFarland never fought for another world title bout.

On January 30, 1911 he fought an 8-round draw in Memphis against the future welterweight legend Jack Britton. On September 15, 1911 Wisconsin officials halted a highly anticipated world lightweight championship boxing match in Milwaukee between Ad Wolgast and McFarland, despite the event's potential to generate over $100,000 for local businesses. Acting Governor Thomas Morris enforced a sporadically used anti-prize-fighting law, deeming the match a threat to public morals, which outraged fans and merchants. On November 30, 1911 he won a hard-fought 20-round victory in San Francisco over Harlem Tommy Murphy. McFarland later called this one of the toughest fights of his career.

On April 26, 1912 he beat Matt Wells at Madison Square Garden, in New York City. On March 7, 1913 and December 8, 1913 he fought No-Decision bouts with Jack Britton. McFarland won the newspaper decisions in these two 10-round fights, in New York and Milwaukee, to unofficially claim the series against Britton.

On September 11, 1915 he fought a No-Decision bout with Mike Gibbons. It was McFarland's final professional fight. He came out of semi-retirement to face the defensive master "The St. Paul Phantom" in Brooklyn. Most reports called it a draw or gave a slight edge to McFarland. It was a tactical, chess-like match between two brilliant boxers.

He was a boxing instructor at Camp Zachary Taylor in 1918. On January 27, 1933, he was appointed to the Illinois Athletic Commission by Governor Henry Horner. McFarland also managed his sizable investments and was director of two banks. He was inducted into the International Boxing Hall of Fame in 1992.

When interviewed in 1980 actor James Cagney said Packey McFarland "was my idol. He was a hell of a boxer. He was a real fighter because he did it all and never even got a black eye. Which was great of course because of the hero worship I felt for him."

== Death ==
McFarland died at Joliet, Illinois, of a streptococcus infection which had attacked his heart.

== Professional boxing record ==
All information in this section is derived from BoxRec, unless otherwise stated.

=== Official Record ===
113 fights	70 wins	0 losses
By knockout	50	0
By decision	19	0
By disqualification	1	0
Draws	5	
Newspaper decisions/draws	38	

All newspaper decisions are officially regarded as “no decision” bouts and are not counted in the win/loss/draw column.

No.	Result	Record	Opponent	Type	Round	Date	Age	Location	Notes
113	Win	70–0–5 (38)	Mike Gibbons	NWS	10	Sep 11, 1915	26 years, 314 days	Brighton Beach Motordrome, New York City, New York, U.S.	
112	Win	70–0–5 (37)	Jack Britton	NWS	10	Dec 8, 1913	25 years, 37 days	Auditorium, Milwaukee, Wisconsin, U.S.	
111	Win	70–0–5 (36)	Harry Trendall	PTS	8	Dec 4, 1913	25 years, 33 days	Coliseum, Saint Louis, Missouri, U.S.	
110	Win	69–0–5 (36)	Harry Brewer	NWS	8	Nov 26, 1913	25 years, 25 days	Windsor A.C., Windsor, Ontario, Canada	
109	Win	69–0–5 (35)	Johnny "Kid" Alberts	NWS	10	Nov 20, 1913	25 years, 19 days	Auditorium, Waterbury, Connecticut, U.S.	
108	Win	69–0–5 (34)	Harlem Tommy Murphy	NWS	10	Oct 17, 1913	24 years, 350 days	Madison Square Garden, New York City, New York, U.S.	
107	Win	69–0–5 (33)	Jack Britton	NWS	10	Mar 7, 1913	24 years, 126 days	Madison Square Garden, New York City, New York, U.S.	
106	Win	69–0–5 (32)	Eddie Murphy	NWS	10	Dec 16, 1912	24 years, 45 days	Coliseum, Kenosha, Wisconsin, U.S.	
105	Win	69–0–5 (31)	Battling Terry	TKO	5 (8)	Dec 4, 1912	24 years, 33 days	Dayton, Ohio, U.S.	
104	Win	68–0–5 (31)	Harry Donahue	NWS	10	Nov 27, 1912	24 years, 26 days	Auditorium, Indianapolis, Indiana, U.S.	
103	Win	68–0–5 (30)	Lockport Jimmy Duffy	NWS	10	Oct 25, 1912	23 years, 359 days	Broadway Auditorium, Buffalo, New York, U.S.	
102	Win	68–0–5 (29)	Johnny "Kid" Alberts	PTS	10	Oct 17, 1912	23 years, 351 days	Cleveland A.C., Cleveland, Ohio, U.S.	
101	Win	67–0–5 (29)	Tommy Kilbane	TKO	7 (10)	Oct 11, 1912	23 years, 345 days	Auditorium Rink, Winnipeg, Manitoba, Canada	
100	Win	66–0–5 (29)	Joe Hirst	NWS	6	Aug 30, 1912	23 years, 303 days	Olympia A.C., Philadelphia, Pennsylvania, U.S.	
99	Win	66–0–5 (28)	Frankie Brennan	TKO	4 (10)	Jun 6, 1912	23 years, 218 days	Muskegon, Michigan, U.S.	
98	Win	65–0–5 (28)	Jeff Boyle	NWS	6	Jun 3, 1912	23 years, 215 days	Wallace Theatre, Peru, Indiana, U.S.	
97	Win	65–0–5 (27)	Ray Bronson	NWS	10	May 29, 1912	23 years, 210 days	Independence Ball Park, Indianapolis, Indiana, U.S.	World welterweight title claim at stake; (via KO only)
96	Win	65–0–5 (26)	Young Erne	NWS	6	May 15, 1912	23 years, 196 days	National A.C., Philadelphia, Pennsylvania, U.S.	
95	Win	65–0–5 (25)	Johnny Connolly	RTD	5 (10)	May 9, 1912	23 years, 190 days	Colonial Club, Fall River, Massachusetts, U.S.	
94	Win	64–0–5 (25)	Red Robinson	NWS	10	May 6, 1912	23 years, 187 days	Olympic A.C., Rochester, New York, U.S.	
93	Win	64–0–5 (24)	Matt Wells	NWS	10	Apr 26, 1912	23 years, 177 days	Madison Square Garden, New York City, New York, U.S.	
92	Win	64–0–5 (23)	Willie Schaeffer	KO	4 (10)	Apr 11, 1912	23 years, 162 days	Empire Athletic Club, Quincy, Illinois, U.S.	
91	Win	63–0–5 (23)	Harry Donahue	NWS	10	Mar 19, 1912	23 years, 139 days	Chattanooga, Tennessee, U.S.	
90	Win	63–0–5 (22)	Kid Burns	TKO	8 (10)	Mar 15, 1912	23 years, 135 days	Coliseum, Kenosha, Wisconsin, U.S.	
89	Win	62–0–5 (22)	One Round Hogan	NWS	10	Mar 5, 1912	23 years, 125 days	Fairmont A.C., New York City, New York, U.S.	
88	Win	62–0–5 (21)	Tommy Devlin	TKO	4 (10)	Feb 29, 1912	23 years, 120 days	Eagles Club, Cleveland, Ohio, U.S.	
87	Win	61–0–5 (21)	Eddie Murphy	NWS	10	Feb 14, 1912	23 years, 105 days	Auditorium Theater, South Bend, Indiana, U.S.	
86	Win	61–0–5 (20)	Kid Burns	NWS	10	Feb 6, 1912	23 years, 97 days	Fairmont A.C., New York City, New York, U.S.	
85	Win	61–0–5 (19)	Jack Ward	NWS	6	Jan 24, 1912	23 years, 84 days	National A.C., Philadelphia, Pennsylvania, U.S.	
84	Win	61–0–5 (18)	Harlem Tommy Murphy	PTS	20	Nov 30, 1911	23 years, 29 days	Coffroth's Arena, Daly City, California, U.S.	
83	Draw	60–0–5 (18)	Tommy Ginty	NWS	6	Nov 4, 1911	23 years, 3 days	Columbia Theater, Scranton, Pennsylvania, U.S.	
82	Win	60–0–5 (17)	Emmett "Kid" Wagner	NWS	3	Nov 3, 1911	23 years, 2 days	Luzerne Theater, Wilkes-Barre, Pennsylvania, U.S.	
81	Win	60–0–5 (16)	Al Dewey	TKO	5 (6)	Oct 30, 1911	22 years, 363 days	Luzerne Theater, Wilkes-Barre, Pennsylvania, U.S.	
80	Win	59–0–5 (16)	Young Ahearn	KO	8 (10)	Jul 3, 1911	22 years, 244 days	Lark Street Auditorium, Albany, New York, U.S.	
79	Win	58–0–5 (16)	Phil Knight	NWS	10	Jun 6, 1911	22 years, 217 days	Columbia Theater, Cleveland, Ohio, U.S.	
78	Win	58–0–5 (15)	Tommy Kilbane	NWS	10	May 12, 1911	22 years, 192 days	Buffalo A.C., Buffalo, New York, U.S.	
77	Win	58–0–5 (14)	Harlem Tommy Murphy	NWS	10	Apr 18, 1911	22 years, 168 days	Fairmont A.C., New York City, New York, U.S.	
76	Win	58–0–5 (13)	Morris Bloom	KO	8 (10)	Apr 7, 1911	22 years, 157 days	Lakeside Auditorium, Racine, Wisconsin, U.S.	
75	Win	57–0–5 (13)	Paul Köhler	NWS	10	Apr 3, 1911	22 years, 153 days	Canton Auditorium, Canton, Ohio, U.S.	
74	Win	57–0–5 (12)	Billy Ryan	TKO	4 (10)	Mar 20, 1911	22 years, 139 days	Richardson Theater, Oswego, New York, U.S.	
73	Win	56–0–5 (12)	Owen Moran	NWS	10	Mar 14, 1911	22 years, 133 days	Fairmont A.C., New York City, New York, U.S.	
72	Win	56–0–5 (11)	Frank Madole	NWS	6	Feb 22, 1911	22 years, 113 days	American A.C., Philadelphia, Pennsylvania, U.S.	
71	Win	56–0–5 (10)	Bert Keyes	NWS	6	Feb 6, 1911	22 years, 97 days	Labor Temple, Pittsburgh, Pennsylvania, U.S.	
70	Draw	56–0–5 (9)	Jack Britton	PTS	8	Jan 30, 1911	22 years, 90 days	Armory AC, Memphis, Tennessee, U.S.	
69	Win	56–0–4 (9)	Young Erne	NWS	6	Jan 25, 1911	22 years, 85 days	National A.C., Philadelphia, Pennsylvania, U.S.	
68	Win	56–0–4 (8)	Jack Goodman	KO	5 (10)	Jan 17, 1911	22 years, 77 days	Fairmont A.C., New York City, New York, U.S.	
67	Win	55–0–4 (8)	Johnny McCarthy	PTS	10	Jan 9, 1911	22 years, 69 days	Grand Avenue A.C., Kansas City, Missouri, U.S.	
66	Win	54–0–4 (8)	Dick Hyland	NWS	10	Sep 27, 1910	21 years, 330 days	Fairmont A.C., New York City, New York, U.S.	
65	Win	54–0–4 (7)	Jack Goldswain	KO	3 (15)	Jun 18, 1910	21 years, 229 days	The Ring, Blackfriars Road, Southwark, London, England, U.K.	
64	Draw	53–0–4 (7)	Freddie Welsh	PTS	20	May 30, 1910	21 years, 210 days	National Sporting Club, Covent Garden, London, England, U.K.	For IBU and Lonsdale lightweight titles
63	Win	53–0–3 (7)	Dick Lee	KO	9 (15)	Apr 1, 1910	21 years, 151 days	Cosmopolitan Gymnasium, Plymouth, Devon, England, U.K.	
62	Win	52–0–3 (7)	Cyclone Johnny Thompson	PTS	10	Nov 8, 1909	21 years, 7 days	Hippodrome, Kansas City, Missouri, U.S.	
61	Draw	51–0–3 (7)	Harry Trendall	PTS	20	Sep 19, 1909	20 years, 322 days	West Side A.C., McDonoughville, Louisiana, U.S.	
60	Win	51–0–2 (7)	Harry Trendall	PTS	10	May 26, 1909	20 years, 206 days	Empire A.C., Kansas City, Missouri, U.S.	
59	Draw	50–0–2 (7)	Dave Deshler	PTS	12	Mar 30, 1909	20 years, 149 days	Armory A.A., Boston, Massachusetts, U.S.	
58	Win	50–0–1 (7)	Leach Cross	NWS	10	Mar 23, 1909	20 years, 142 days	Fairmont A.C., New York City, New York, U.S.	
57	Win	50–0–1 (6)	Dick Hyland	NWS	10	Jan 15, 1909	20 years, 75 days	Naud Junction Pavilion, Los Angeles, California, U.S.	
56	Win	50–0–1 (5)	Harlem Tommy Murphy	NWS	6	Nov 18, 1908	20 years, 17 days	National A.C., Philadelphia, Pennsylvania, U.S.	
55	Win	50–0–1 (4)	Leach Cross	NWS	6	Oct 21, 1908	19 years, 355 days	Fairmont A.C., New York City, New York, U.S.	
54	Win	50–0–1 (3)	Phil Brock	TKO	7 (10)	Aug 7, 1908	19 years, 280 days	Pacific A.C., Los Angeles, California, U.S.	
53	Draw	49–0–1 (3)	Freddie Welsh	PTS	25	Jul 4, 1908	19 years, 246 days	Jeffries' Arena, Vernon, California, U.S.	
52	Win	49–0 (3)	Jimmy Britt	TKO	6 (20)	Apr 11, 1908	19 years, 162 days	Mission Street Arena, Colma, California, U.S.	
51	Win	48–0 (3)	Freddie Welsh	PTS	10	Feb 21, 1908	19 years, 112 days	Hippodrome, Milwaukee, Wisconsin, U.S.	
50	Win	47–0 (3)	Young Loughrey	NWS	6	Jan 28, 1908	19 years, 88 days	National A.C., Philadelphia, Pennsylvania, U.S.	
49	Win	47–0 (2)	Bert Keyes	PTS	12	Jan 14, 1908	19 years, 74 days	Armory, Boston, Massachusetts, U.S.	
48	Win	46–0 (2)	Kid Herman	NWS	15	Nov 21, 1907	19 years, 20 days	Coliseum, Davenport, Iowa, U.S.	
47	Win	46–0 (1)	Abraham "Kid" Goodman	PTS	10	Oct 23, 1907	18 years, 356 days	Princess Rink, Fort Wayne, Indiana, U.S.	
46	Win	45–0 (1)	Joe Galligan	KO	9 (10)	Oct 16, 1907	18 years, 349 days	Auditorium, Indianapolis, Indiana, U.S.	
45	Win	44–0 (1)	Benny Yanger	TKO	4 (10)	Aug 20, 1907	18 years, 292 days	League Park, Fort Wayne, Indiana, U.S.	
44	Win	43–0 (1)	Charles Neary	PTS	10	Jun 28, 1907	18 years, 239 days	Hippodrome, Milwaukee, Wisconsin, U.S.	
43	Win	42–0 (1)	Maurice Sayers	PTS	10	May 10, 1907	18 years, 190 days	Schlitz Park, Milwaukee, Wisconsin, U.S.	
42	Win	41–0 (1)	Abraham "Kid" Goodman	PTS	15	Apr 16, 1907	18 years, 166 days	Davenport, Iowa, U.S.	
41	Win	40–0 (1)	Joe Galligan	TKO	8 (15)	Mar 12, 1907	18 years, 131 days	Davenport, Iowa, U.S.	
40	Win	39–0 (1)	Jim Fretzel	KO	2 (?)	Mar 2, 1907	18 years, 121 days	Morgan Athletic Club, Chicago, Illinois, U.S.	
39	Win	38–0 (1)	Steve Kinney	KO	9 (15)	Feb 20, 1907	18 years, 111 days	Tri-City A.C., Davenport, Iowa, U.S.	
38	Win	37–0 (1)	Jack Fox	KO	4 (?)	Dec 23, 1906	18 years, 52 days	Summit, Illinois, U.S.	
37	Win	36–0 (1)	Young Morris	KO	2 (?)	Nov 15, 1906	18 years, 14 days	Burtis Opera House, Davenport, Iowa, U.S.	
36	Win	35–0 (1)	Freddie Gilmore	KO	3 (10)	Oct 24, 1906	17 years, 357 days	Ozark A.C., Davenport, Iowa, U.S.	
35	Win	34–0 (1)	Billy Finucane	KO	5 (10)	Oct 11, 1906	17 years, 348 days	Tri-City A.C., Davenport, Iowa, U.S.	
34	Win	33–0 (1)	Jack Harding	KO	4 (?)	Aug 15, 1906	17 years, 287 days	Hammond, Indiana, U.S.	
33	Win	32–0 (1)	Eddie Linden	KO	2 (?)	Jul 25, 1906	17 years, 266 days	Chicago, Illinois, U.S.	
32	Win	31–0 (1)	Ike Nelson	KO	4 (?)	Jul 10, 1906	17 years, 251 days	Hammond, Indiana, U.S.	
31	Win	30–0 (1)	Jimmy Ross	KO	3 (?)	Jun 30, 1906	17 years, 210 days	Summit, Illinois, U.S.	
30	Win	29–0 (1)	Tommy Moore	KO	2 (?)	Jun 29, 1906	17 years, 209 days	Tri-City A.C., Davenport, Iowa, U.S.	
29	Win	28–0 (1)	Kid Brewer	DQ	3 (6)	May 31, 1906	17 years, 211 days	Tri-City A.C., Davenport, Iowa, U.S.	
28	Win	27–0 (1)	Nate Frazier	PTS	6	Apr 19, 1906	17 years, 169 days	Peoria, Illinois, U.S.	
27	Win	26–0 (1)	Kid Ebbert	KO	4 (?)	Feb 14, 1906	17 years, 105 days	Milwaukee, Wisconsin, U.S.	
26	Win	25–0 (1)	Kid Isse	KO	2 (?)	Feb 10, 1906	17 years, 101 days	Milwaukee, Wisconsin, U.S.	
25	Win	24–0 (1)	Eddie West	KO	2 (?)	Feb 6, 1906	17 years, 97 days	Chicago, Illinois, U.S.	
24	Win	23–0 (1)	Eddie Preston	TKO	3 (?)	Jan 24, 1906	17 years, 84 days	Armory, Grand Rapids, Michigan, U.S.	
23	Win	22–0 (1)	Hughey Gates	KO	4 (?)	Jul 28, 1905	16 years, 269 days	Chicago, Illinois, U.S.	
22	Win	21–0 (1)	Jack Crammer	KO	4 (?)	Jun 10, 1905	16 years, 221 days	Michigan City, Indiana, U.S.	
21	Win	20–0 (1)	Eddie Connely	KO	2 (?)	May 4, 1905	16 years, 184 days	Summit, Illinois, U.S.	
20	Win	19–0 (1)	Jim Sweeney	KO	3 (?)	Apr 6, 1905	16 years, 156 days	Chicago, Illinois, U.S.	
19	Win	18–0 (1)	Kid Greenburg	KO	5 (?)	Mar 22, 1905	16 years, 141 days	Chicago, Illinois, U.S.	
18	Win	17–0 (1)	Jack Carr	KO	3 (?)	Mar 12, 1905	16 years, 131 days	Chicago, Illinois, U.S.	
17	Win	16–0 (1)	Jimmy Murray	PTS	6	Mar 5, 1905	16 years, 124 days	Chicago, Illinois, U.S.	
16	Win	15–0 (1)	Orville Thorne	PTS	6	Feb 18, 1905	16 years, 109 days	Chicago, Illinois, U.S.	
15	Win	14–0 (1)	Jack Meyers	KO	3 (?)	Feb 10, 1905	16 years, 101 days	South Bend, Indiana, U.S.	
14	Win	13–0 (1)	Jack Walker	KO	4 (?)	Jan 24, 1905	16 years, 84 days	Chicago, Illinois, U.S.	
13	Win	12–0 (1)	Bobby Ferris	PTS	6	Jan 19, 1905	16 years, 79 days	Elkhart Athletic Club, Elkhart, Indiana, U.S.	
12	Win	11–0 (1)	Kid Greenburg	KO	5 (6)	Dec 10, 1904	16 years, 39 days	Riding & Driving Club, Chicago, Illinois, U.S.	
11	Win	10–0 (1)	Jim Sweeney	PTS	6	Nov 26, 1904	16 years, 25 days	Riding & Driving Club, Chicago, Illinois, U.S.	
10	Win	9–0 (1)	Young Fitzsimmons	KO	3 (?)	Oct 26, 1904	15 years, 360 days	Interurban Athletic Club, South Bend, Indiana, U.S.	
9	Loss	8–0 (1)	Dusty Miller	DQ	?	Jul 13, 1904	15 years, 255 days	United States of America	Exact date, location, and result unknown; L-KO5 in most versions of McFarland's record, but was most likely a disqualification. Bout may also have been a NC–ND, an exhibition, or it may never have happened at all.
8	Win	8–0	Kid Black	KO	4 (?)	Jun 1, 1904	15 years, 213 days	United States of America	Exact date & location unknown
7	Win	7–0	Shorty Lang	KO	1 (?)	May 1, 1904	15 years, 182 days	United States of America	Exact date & location unknown
6	Win	6–0	Kid Harris	KO	5 (?)	Apr 1, 1904	15 years, 152 days	United States of America	Exact date & location unknown
5	Win	5–0	Kid Siefert	PTS	6	Mar 22, 1904	15 years, 142 days	South Bend, Indiana, U.S.	
4	Win	4–0	John West	KO	4 (?)	Mar 1, 1904	15 years, 121 days	United States of America	Exact date & location unknown
3	Win	3–0	Jimmy Murray	PTS	6	Feb 17, 1904	15 years, 92 days	Twenty-second Ward A.C., Chicago, Illinois, U.S.	
2	Win	2–0	Kid Wallace	KO	2 (?)	Feb 1, 1904	15 years, 92 days	United States of America	Exact date & location unknown
1	Win	1–0	Pete West	KO	2 (?)	Jan 1, 1904	15 years, 61 days	United States of America	Professional debut; Exact date & location unknown

=== Unofficial record ===
113 fights	106 wins	1 loss
By knockout	50	0
By decision	55	0
By disqualification	1	1
Draws	6	

Record with the inclusion of newspaper decisions in the win/loss/draw column.

No.	Result	Record	Opponent	Type	Round	Date	Age	Location	Notes
113	Win	106–1–6	Mike Gibbons	NWS	10	Sep 11, 1915	26 years, 314 days	Brighton Beach Motordrome, New York City, New York, U.S.	
112	Win	105–1–6	Jack Britton	NWS	10	Dec 8, 1913	25 years, 37 days	Auditorium, Milwaukee, Wisconsin, U.S.	
111	Win	104–1–6	Harry Trendall	PTS	8	Dec 4, 1913	25 years, 33 days	Coliseum, Saint Louis, Missouri, U.S.	
110	Win	103–1–6	Harry Brewer	NWS	8	Nov 26, 1913	25 years, 25 days	Windsor A.C., Windsor, Ontario, Canada	
109	Win	102–1–6	Johnny "Kid" Alberts	NWS	10	Nov 20, 1913	25 years, 19 days	Auditorium, Waterbury, Connecticut, U.S.	
108	Win	101–1–6	Harlem Tommy Murphy	NWS	10	Oct 17, 1913	24 years, 350 days	Madison Square Garden, New York City, New York, U.S.	
107	Win	100–1–6	Jack Britton	NWS	10	Mar 7, 1913	24 years, 126 days	Madison Square Garden, New York City, New York, U.S.	
106	Win	99–1–6	Eddie Murphy	NWS	10	Dec 16, 1912	24 years, 45 days	Coliseum, Kenosha, Wisconsin, U.S.	
105	Win	98–1–6	Battling Terry	TKO	5 (8)	Dec 4, 1912	24 years, 33 days	Dayton, Ohio, U.S.	
104	Win	97–1–6	Harry Donahue	NWS	10	Nov 27, 1912	24 years, 26 days	Auditorium, Indianapolis, Indiana, U.S.	
103	Win	96–1–6	Lockport Jimmy Duffy	NWS	10	Oct 25, 1912	23 years, 359 days	Broadway Auditorium, Buffalo, New York, U.S.	
102	Win	95–1–6	Johnny "Kid" Alberts	PTS	10	Oct 17, 1912	23 years, 351 days	Cleveland A.C., Cleveland, Ohio, U.S.	
101	Win	94–1–6	Tommy Kilbane	TKO	7 (10)	Oct 11, 1912	23 years, 345 days	Auditorium Rink, Winnipeg, Manitoba, Canada	
100	Win	93–1–6	Joe Hirst	NWS	6	Aug 30, 1912	23 years, 303 days	Olympia A.C., Philadelphia, Pennsylvania, U.S.	
99	Win	92–1–6	Frankie Brennan	TKO	4 (10)	Jun 6, 1912	23 years, 218 days	Muskegon, Michigan, U.S.	
98	Win	91–1–6	Jeff Boyle	NWS	6	Jun 3, 1912	23 years, 215 days	Wallace Theatre, Peru, Indiana, U.S.	
97	Win	90–1–6	Ray Bronson	NWS	10	May 29, 1912	23 years, 210 days	Independence Ball Park, Indianapolis, Indiana, U.S.	World welterweight title claim at stake; (via KO only)
96	Win	89–1–6	Young Erne	NWS	6	May 15, 1912	23 years, 196 days	National A.C., Philadelphia, Pennsylvania, U.S.	
95	Win	88–1–6	Johnny Connolly	RTD	5 (10)	May 9, 1912	23 years, 190 days	Colonial Club, Fall River, Massachusetts, U.S.	
94	Win	87–1–6	Red Robinson	NWS	10	May 6, 1912	23 years, 187 days	Olympic A.C., Rochester, New York, U.S.	
93	Win	86–1–6	Matt Wells	NWS	10	Apr 26, 1912	23 years, 177 days	Madison Square Garden, New York City, New York, U.S.	
92	Win	85–1–6	Willie Schaeffer	KO	4 (10)	Apr 11, 1912	23 years, 162 days	Empire Athletic Club, Quincy, Illinois, U.S.	
91	Win	84–1–6	Harry Donahue	NWS	10	Mar 19, 1912	23 years, 139 days	Chattanooga, Tennessee, U.S.	
90	Win	83–1–6	Kid Burns	TKO	8 (10)	Mar 15, 1912	23 years, 135 days	Coliseum, Kenosha, Wisconsin, U.S.	
89	Win	82–1–6	One Round Hogan	NWS	10	Mar 5, 1912	23 years, 125 days	Fairmont A.C., New York City, New York, U.S.	
88	Win	81–1–6	Tommy Devlin	TKO	4 (10)	Feb 29, 1912	23 years, 120 days	Eagles Club, Cleveland, Ohio, U.S.	
87	Win	80–1–6	Eddie Murphy	NWS	10	Feb 14, 1912	23 years, 105 days	Auditorium Theater, South Bend, Indiana, U.S.	
86	Win	79–1–6	Kid Burns	NWS	10	Feb 6, 1912	23 years, 97 days	Fairmont A.C., New York City, New York, U.S.	
85	Win	78–1–6	Jack Ward	NWS	6	Jan 24, 1912	23 years, 84 days	National A.C., Philadelphia, Pennsylvania, U.S.	
84	Win	77–1–6	Harlem Tommy Murphy	PTS	20	Nov 30, 1911	23 years, 29 days	Coffroth's Arena, Daly City, California, U.S.	
83	Draw	76–1–6	Tommy Ginty	NWS	6	Nov 4, 1911	23 years, 3 days	Columbia Theater, Scranton, Pennsylvania, U.S.	
82	Win	76–1–5	Emmett "Kid" Wagner	NWS	3	Nov 3, 1911	23 years, 2 days	Luzerne Theater, Wilkes-Barre, Pennsylvania, U.S.	
81	Win	75–1–5	Al Dewey	TKO	5 (6)	Oct 30, 1911	22 years, 363 days	Luzerne Theater, Wilkes-Barre, Pennsylvania, U.S.	
80	Win	74–1–5	Young Ahearn	KO	8 (10)	Jul 3, 1911	22 years, 244 days	Lark Street Auditorium, Albany, New York, U.S.	
79	Win	73–1–5	Phil Knight	NWS	10	Jun 6, 1911	22 years, 217 days	Columbia Theater, Cleveland, Ohio, U.S.	
78	Win	72–1–5	Tommy Kilbane	NWS	10	May 12, 1911	22 years, 192 days	Buffalo A.C., Buffalo, New York, U.S.	
77	Win	71–1–5	Harlem Tommy Murphy	NWS	10	Apr 18, 1911	22 years, 168 days	Fairmont A.C., New York City, New York, U.S.	
76	Win	70–1–5	Morris Bloom	KO	8 (10)	Apr 7, 1911	22 years, 157 days	Lakeside Auditorium, Racine, Wisconsin, U.S.	
75	Win	69–1–5	Paul Köhler	NWS	10	Apr 3, 1911	22 years, 153 days	Canton Auditorium, Canton, Ohio, U.S.	
74	Win	68–1–5	Billy Ryan	TKO	4 (10)	Mar 20, 1911	22 years, 139 days	Richardson Theater, Oswego, New York, U.S.	
73	Win	67–1–5	Owen Moran	NWS	10	Mar 14, 1911	22 years, 133 days	Fairmont A.C., New York City, New York, U.S.	
72	Win	66–1–5	Frank Madole	NWS	6	Feb 22, 1911	22 years, 113 days	American A.C., Philadelphia, Pennsylvania, U.S.	
71	Win	65–1–5	Bert Keyes	NWS	6	Feb 6, 1911	22 years, 97 days	Labor Temple, Pittsburgh, Pennsylvania, U.S.	
70	Draw	64–1–5	Jack Britton	PTS	8	Jan 30, 1911	22 years, 90 days	Armory AC, Memphis, Tennessee, U.S.	
69	Win	64–1–4	Young Erne	NWS	6	Jan 25, 1911	22 years, 85 days	National A.C., Philadelphia, Pennsylvania, U.S.	
68	Win	63–1–4	Jack Goodman	KO	5 (10)	Jan 17, 1911	22 years, 77 days	Fairmont A.C., New York City, New York, U.S.	
67	Win	62–1–4	Johnny McCarthy	PTS	10	Jan 9, 1911	22 years, 69 days	Grand Avenue A.C., Kansas City, Missouri, U.S.	
66	Win	61–1–4	Dick Hyland	NWS	10	Sep 27, 1910	21 years, 330 days	Fairmont A.C., New York City, New York, U.S.	
65	Win	60–1–4	Jack Goldswain	KO	3 (15)	Jun 18, 1910	21 years, 229 days	The Ring, Blackfriars Road, Southwark, London, England, U.K.	
64	Draw	59–1–4	Freddie Welsh	PTS	20	May 30, 1910	21 years, 210 days	National Sporting Club, Covent Garden, London, England, U.K.	For IBU and Lonsdale lightweight titles
63	Win	59–1–3	Dick Lee	KO	9 (15)	Apr 1, 1910	21 years, 151 days	Cosmopolitan Gymnasium, Plymouth, Devon, England, U.K.	
62	Win	58–1–3	Cyclone Johnny Thompson	PTS	10	Nov 8, 1909	21 years, 7 days	Hippodrome, Kansas City, Missouri, U.S.	
61	Draw	57–1–3	Harry Trendall	PTS	20	Sep 19, 1909	20 years, 322 days	West Side A.C., McDonoughville, Louisiana, U.S.	
60	Win	57–1–2	Harry Trendall	PTS	10	May 26, 1909	20 years, 206 days	Empire A.C., Kansas City, Missouri, U.S.	
59	Draw	56–1–2	Dave Deshler	PTS	12	Mar 30, 1909	20 years, 149 days	Armory A.A., Boston, Massachusetts, U.S.	
58	Win	56–1–1	Leach Cross	NWS	10	Mar 23, 1909	20 years, 142 days	Fairmont A.C., New York City, New York, U.S.	
57	Win	55–1–1	Dick Hyland	NWS	10	Jan 15, 1909	20 years, 75 days	Naud Junction Pavilion, Los Angeles, California, U.S.	
56	Win	54–1–1	Harlem Tommy Murphy	NWS	6	Nov 18, 1908	20 years, 17 days	National A.C., Philadelphia, Pennsylvania, U.S.	
55	Win	53–1–1	Leach Cross	NWS	6	Oct 21, 1908	19 years, 355 days	Fairmont A.C., New York City, New York, U.S.	
54	Win	52–1–1	Phil Brock	TKO	7 (10)	Aug 7, 1908	19 years, 280 days	Pacific A.C., Los Angeles, California, U.S.	
53	Draw	51–1–1	Freddie Welsh	PTS	25	Jul 4, 1908	19 years, 246 days	Jeffries' Arena, Vernon, California, U.S.	
52	Win	51–1	Jimmy Britt	TKO	6 (20)	Apr 11, 1908	19 years, 162 days	Mission Street Arena, Colma, California, U.S.	
51	Win	50–1	Freddie Welsh	PTS	10	Feb 21, 1908	19 years, 112 days	Hippodrome, Milwaukee, Wisconsin, U.S.	
50	Win	49–1	Young Loughrey	NWS	6	Jan 28, 1908	19 years, 88 days	National A.C., Philadelphia, Pennsylvania, U.S.	
49	Win	48–1	Bert Keyes	PTS	12	Jan 14, 1908	19 years, 74 days	Armory, Boston, Massachusetts, U.S.	
48	Win	47–1	Kid Herman	NWS	15	Nov 21, 1907	19 years, 20 days	Coliseum, Davenport, Iowa, U.S.	
47	Win	46–1	Abraham "Kid" Goodman	PTS	10	Oct 23, 1907	18 years, 356 days	Princess Rink, Fort Wayne, Indiana, U.S.	
46	Win	45–1	Joe Galligan	KO	9 (10)	Oct 16, 1907	18 years, 349 days	Auditorium, Indianapolis, Indiana, U.S.	
45	Win	44–1	Benny Yanger	TKO	4 (10)	Aug 20, 1907	18 years, 292 days	League Park, Fort Wayne, Indiana, U.S.	
44	Win	43–1	Charles Neary	PTS	10	Jun 28, 1907	18 years, 239 days	Hippodrome, Milwaukee, Wisconsin, U.S.	
43	Win	42–1	Maurice Sayers	PTS	10	May 10, 1907	18 years, 190 days	Schlitz Park, Milwaukee, Wisconsin, U.S.	
42	Win	41–1	Abraham "Kid" Goodman	PTS	15	Apr 16, 1907	18 years, 166 days	Davenport, Iowa, U.S.	
41	Win	40–1	Joe Galligan	TKO	8 (15)	Mar 12, 1907	18 years, 131 days	Davenport, Iowa, U.S.	
40	Win	39–1	Jim Fretzel	KO	2 (?)	Mar 2, 1907	18 years, 121 days	Morgan Athletic Club, Chicago, Illinois, U.S.	
39	Win	38–1	Steve Kinney	KO	9 (15)	Feb 20, 1907	18 years, 111 days	Tri-City A.C., Davenport, Iowa, U.S.	
38	Win	37–1	Jack Fox	KO	4 (?)	Dec 23, 1906	18 years, 52 days	Summit, Illinois, U.S.	
37	Win	36–1	Young Morris	KO	2 (?)	Nov 15, 1906	18 years, 14 days	Burtis Opera House, Davenport, Iowa, U.S.	
36	Win	35–1	Freddie Gilmore	KO	3 (10)	Oct 24, 1906	17 years, 357 days	Ozark A.C., Davenport, Iowa, U.S.	
35	Win	34–1	Billy Finucane	KO	5 (10)	Oct 11, 1906	17 years, 348 days	Tri-City A.C., Davenport, Iowa, U.S.	
34	Win	33–1	Jack Harding	KO	4 (?)	Aug 15, 1906	17 years, 287 days	Hammond, Indiana, U.S.	
33	Win	32–1	Eddie Linden	KO	2 (?)	Jul 25, 1906	17 years, 266 days	Chicago, Illinois, U.S.	
32	Win	31–1	Ike Nelson	KO	4 (?)	Jul 10, 1906	17 years, 251 days	Hammond, Indiana, U.S.	
31	Win	30–1	Jimmy Ross	KO	3 (?)	Jun 30, 1906	17 years, 210 days	Summit, Illinois, U.S.	
30	Win	29–1	Tommy Moore	KO	2 (?)	Jun 29, 1906	17 years, 209 days	Tri-City A.C., Davenport, Iowa, U.S.	
29	Win	28–1	Kid Brewer	DQ	3 (6)	May 31, 1906	17 years, 211 days	Tri-City A.C., Davenport, Iowa, U.S.	
28	Win	27–1	Nate Frazier	PTS	6	Apr 19, 1906	17 years, 169 days	Peoria, Illinois, U.S.	
27	Win	26–1	Kid Ebbert	KO	4 (?)	Feb 14, 1906	17 years, 105 days	Milwaukee, Wisconsin, U.S.	
26	Win	25–1	Kid Isse	KO	2 (?)	Feb 10, 1906	17 years, 101 days	Milwaukee, Wisconsin, U.S.	
25	Win	24–1	Eddie West	KO	2 (?)	Feb 6, 1906	17 years, 97 days	Chicago, Illinois, U.S.	
24	Win	23–1	Eddie Preston	TKO	3 (?)	Jan 24, 1906	17 years, 84 days	Armory, Grand Rapids, Michigan, U.S.	
23	Win	22–1	Hughey Gates	KO	4 (?)	Jul 28, 1905	16 years, 269 days	Chicago, Illinois, U.S.	
22	Win	21–1	Jack Crammer	KO	4 (?)	Jun 10, 1905	16 years, 221 days	Michigan City, Indiana, U.S.	
21	Win	20–1	Eddie Connely	KO	2 (?)	May 4, 1905	16 years, 184 days	Summit, Illinois, U.S.	
20	Win	19–1	Jim Sweeney	KO	3 (?)	Apr 6, 1905	16 years, 156 days	Chicago, Illinois, U.S.	
19	Win	18–1	Kid Greenburg	KO	5 (?)	Mar 22, 1905	16 years, 141 days	Chicago, Illinois, U.S.	
18	Win	17–1	Jack Carr	KO	3 (?)	Mar 12, 1905	16 years, 131 days	Chicago, Illinois, U.S.	
17	Win	16–1	Jimmy Murray	PTS	6	Mar 5, 1905	16 years, 124 days	Chicago, Illinois, U.S.	
16	Win	15–1	Orville Thorne	PTS	6	Feb 18, 1905	16 years, 109 days	Chicago, Illinois, U.S.	
15	Win	14–1	Jack Meyers	KO	3 (?)	Feb 10, 1905	16 years, 101 days	South Bend, Indiana, U.S.	
14	Win	13–1	Jack Walker	KO	4 (?)	Jan 24, 1905	16 years, 84 days	Chicago, Illinois, U.S.	
13	Win	12–1	Bobby Ferris	PTS	6	Jan 19, 1905	16 years, 79 days	Elkhart Athletic Club, Elkhart, Indiana, U.S.	
12	Win	11–1	Kid Greenburg	KO	5 (6)	Dec 10, 1904	16 years, 39 days	Riding & Driving Club, Chicago, Illinois, U.S.	
11	Win	10–1	Jim Sweeney	PTS	6	Nov 26, 1904	16 years, 25 days	Riding & Driving Club, Chicago, Illinois, U.S.	
10	Win	9–1	Young Fitzsimmons	KO	3 (?)	Oct 26, 1904	15 years, 360 days	Interurban Athletic Club, South Bend, Indiana, U.S.	
9	Loss	8–1	Dusty Miller	DQ	?	Jul 13, 1904	15 years, 255 days	United States of America	Exact date, location, and result unknown; L-KO5 in most versions of McFarland's record, but was most likely a disqualification. Bout may also have been a NC–ND, an exhibition, or it may never have happened at all.
8	Win	8–0	Kid Black	KO	4 (?)	Jun 1, 1904	15 years, 213 days	United States of America	Exact date & location unknown
7	Win	7–0	Shorty Lang	KO	1 (?)	May 1, 1904	15 years, 182 days	United States of America	Exact date & location unknown
6	Win	6–0	Kid Harris	KO	5 (?)	Apr 1, 1904	15 years, 152 days	United States of America	Exact date & location unknown
5	Win	5–0	Kid Siefert	PTS	6	Mar 22, 1904	15 years, 142 days	South Bend, Indiana, U.S.	
4	Win	4–0	John West	KO	4 (?)	Mar 1, 1904	15 years, 121 days	United States of America	Exact date & location unknown
3	Win	3–0	Jimmy Murray	PTS	6	Feb 17, 1904	15 years, 92 days	Twenty-second Ward A.C., Chicago, Illinois, U.S.	
2	Win	2–0	Kid Wallace	KO	2 (?)	Feb 1, 1904	15 years, 92 days	United States of America	Exact date & location unknown
1	Win	1–0	Pete West	KO	2 (?)	Jan 1, 1904	15 years, 61 days	United States of America	Professional debut; Exact date & location unknown
