= Young Brown =

American boxer

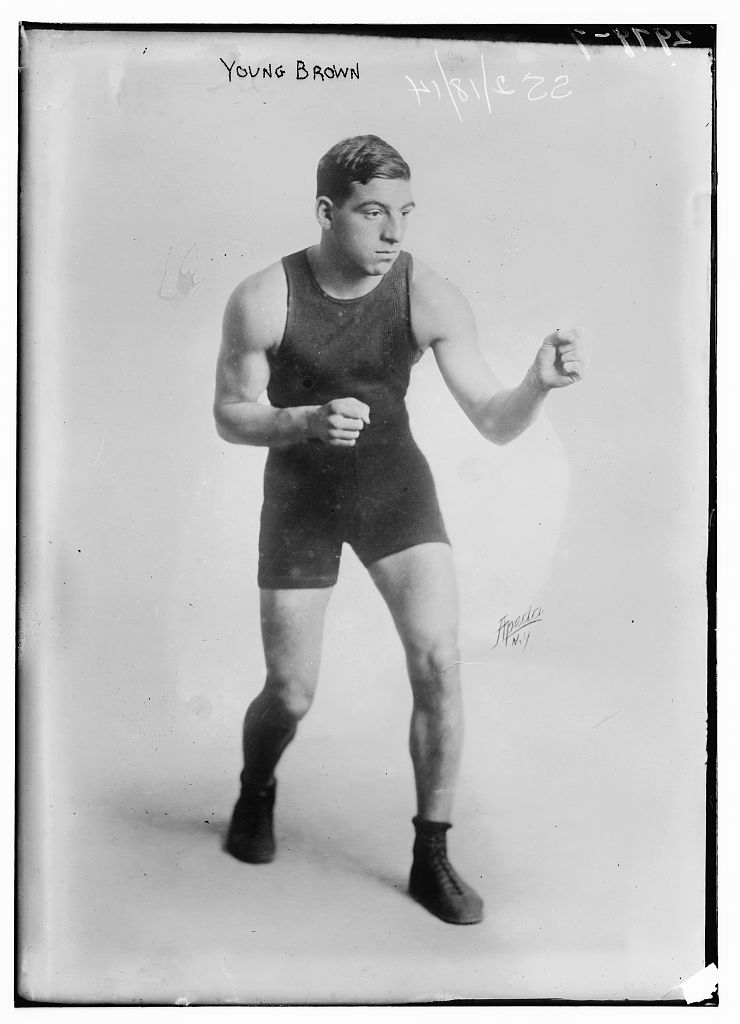

Young Brown, or Abe Brown (born September 24, 1893, date of death unknown), was an American welterweight boxer from New York City.

== Biography ==
Brown was born on September 24, 1893. On September 18, 1912, he boxed Young Jack O'Brien at the St. Nicholas Arena in New York City.
