= Llew Edwards (boxer) =

British boxer (1894–1965)

- Edwards circa 1920

Personal information
- Nickname: The Welsh Wizard
- Nationality: Welsh
- Born: Hiram Llewellyn Edwards; 22 October 1894 Llynclys, Shropshire, England moved to Porth, Wales
- Died: 1965 Australia
- Height: 5 ft 7 in / 170 cm
- Weight: Featherweight, Lightweight

Boxing career
- Reach: 70″ / 178 cm
- Stance: Orthodox

Boxing record
- Total fights: 100
- Wins: 83
- Win by KO: 41
- Losses: 12
- Draws: 5

Llewellyn "Llew" Edwards (22 October 1894 – 1965) was a Welsh boxer who fought professionally between 1913 and 1922. He is most noted for winning both the British and the British Empire featherweight boxing titles in 1915 and for an outstanding winning record with a nearly 50% knockout ratio. He took the Australian lightweight title against Herb McCoy in 1916.

== Early life and boxing career ==
Born in Llynclys, Shropshire, England, in 1884, he was raised on a Shropshire farm in England's West Midlands. Edwards' boxing career did not begin until he moved Southeast to South Wales in the Rhondda Valley where he began his professional boxing career around 1913 at the age of twenty-seven in his new hometown of Porth, Wales. One of his earliest opponents was Billy Phillips, an average Welsh bantamweight who fell to Edwards in April and January 1913 in Porth and Tonypandy in two eight round points decisions.

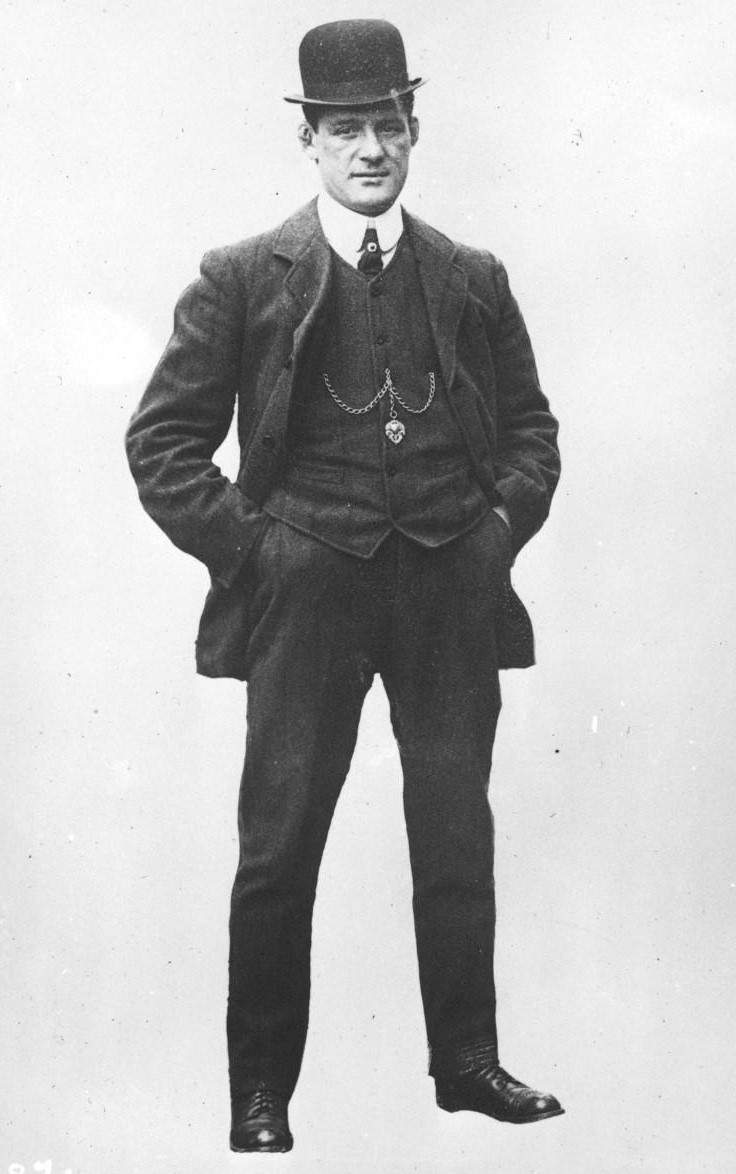
Featherweight Jim Driscoll

Britain's 1910 featherweight champion Jim Driscoll, a fellow Welsh boxer from nearby Cardiff, acted as a mentor to Edwards in his career. Driscoll fought many of the same boxers, particularly Owen Moran for the British Empire featherweight title. Driscoll was twelve years older and able to share his boxing experience with his friend and fellow Welshman Edwards. His stellar boxing career was over in 1913, just as Edwards's was beginning his career and already showing remarkable potential.

Welsh boxers;Edwards front row right, and Driscoll, immediately behind and left, Jimmy Wilde immediate left

Edwards was soon traveling North to thriving Liverpool and later East to London to face opponents such as Lancashire resident Harold Walker, a competent featherweight just short of contender status, whom he defeated handily in a seventh-round technical knockout at Liverpool Stadium on 26 March 1913.

Edwards defeated featherweight contender Alec Lambert in a seventh-round knockout on 4 May 1914 at London's prestigious National Sporting Club at Covent Gardens. In pre-fight publicity, mentor Jim Driscoll accurately touted Edwards as the next British featherweight champion, though it would take Edwards another year to achieve the title. Lambert boxed in the traditional, upstanding British style and kept a light leading left typical of amateurs, but he had developed a strong punch as a professional. Edwards expertly evaded Lambert's fierce swings and uppercuts with a superior defense characteristic of his future style. He boxed at a great pace and Lambert had no answer for his repeated short left that stopped him consistently. Edwards's footwork, another characteristic strength, gave him better leverage in his punches and Lambert was down twice for six and eight second counts in the seventh. As their boxer was unable to resume the fight shortly after a devastating hook in the chest, Lambert's handlers stopped the bout.

The Welsh boxer, as a rising star, began a winning streak on 22 September 1913 that continued nearly uninterrupted until 13 May 1915, when he next met Owen Moran for the title.

== Taking the British and British Empire featherweight title, Owen Moran, 1915 ==
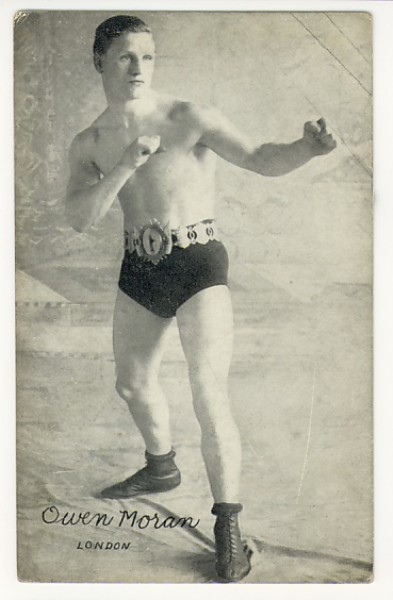
Owen Moran

In early 1915, Edwards fought at the prestigious Covent Garden in London to challenge for the British and British Empire Featherweight title, left vacant by Ted "Kid" Lewis. Edwards first defeated Young Joe Brooks, and then Seaman Arthur Hayes in a first-round TKO in the British featherweight title eliminator at London's Covent Garden on 5 April 1915.

These wins allowed him to face the exceptional British champion Owen Moran in the title match on 31 May 1915 at Covent Garden's National Sporting Club, the most prestigious boxing venue in London. The incomparable Moran was a former British and world bantamweight champion, and the most accomplished opponent of Edwards's career. With one hundred wins already in his record, the Cincinnati Enquirer, picked Edwards to become the new British champion, and he handily achieved the feat after Moran was disqualified in the tenth round for repeatedly punching low. It was the prime of his career and Edwards's greatest victory. One week earlier, he had stunned a sizable audience by knocking out featherweight contender Harold Walker in one round at the West London Stadium. Having married earlier in June, Edwards sailed for Australia in July, where he had eleven fights arranged with guaranteed earnings of £2,500.

== Vacating the British title to box in Australia, 1915-1916 ==
Edwards took criticism from his countrymen for leaving Great Britain in 1915 and choosing to continue his boxing career rather than return to Britain and volunteer for military service during WWI. His British and British Empire featherweight title was vacated in 1916, with Edwards out of the country and no longer defending it in his homeland.

Edwards then spent the majority of his boxing career in Australia, fighting for a while in the Philippines and then in the United States. He did not return to the United Kingdom to fight until nearing the end of his professional career in 1920. His decision to avoid military service cost him in popularity and denied him a shot at the world feather or lightweight titles during the war years when he was at the peak of his career.

On 24 April 1916, he knocked out Frank Thorn in the third round before a large house at Australia's Brisbane Stadium. Edwards landed a right hand punch to the chin that knocked out Thorn.

=== British featherweight title defenses against Jimmy Hill, Sydney Stadium ===
Edwards successfully defended his featherweight British Empire title against former Australian champion and native Jimmy Hill, in a 13th-round TKO on 18 December 1915, at Sydney Stadium, when Hill's corner threw in the towel after their fighter was knocked down for the eighth time during the bout. He soundly defeated Hill again in a fifth-round knockout at Sydney Stadium on 15 July 1916, and again in a sixth-round knockout on 27 November 1918 in Sydney.

George Taylor fell to Edwards on 1 January 1916 in a seventh-round knockout at Australia's Brisbane Stadium. Edwards' display was considered by one reporter, "the most vigorous lightweight fighting ever seen in Brisbane".

On 13 May 1916, Bert Spargo, of Victoria, whom Edwards had lost to in April, fell to Edwards in a fourteenth-round knockout at Melbourne Stadium. Edwards's rise to the Australian lightweight championship looked imminent.

== Taking the Australian lightweight title, Herb McCoy, 1916 ==
He first met Australian lightweight champion Herb McCoy in a non-title 20 round win on points on 27 May 1916 in Sydney Stadium.

Edwards fought for the Australian lightweight title against McCoy on 1 July 1916, but the bout resulted in a draw. The two met again on 11 November at West Melbourne Stadium with Edwards winning in a twenty-round points decision, and taking the lightweight title.

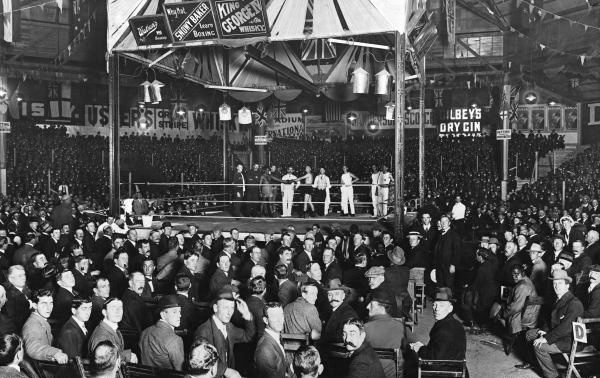
Sydney Stadium, 1913

He successfully defended the Australian lightweight title for the last time against McCoy on 10 February 1917 in an eighteenth-round knockout at Sydney Stadium, and after relinquishing the title, regained it on 12 January 1920 with a second-round knockout of Frank Brogan in Sydney's Hippodrome.

=== Boxing in the Philippines, 1919 ===
Edwards sailed to the Philippines and boxed from 22 February, until 9 August 1919 at the Olympic Stadium in Manila, and met with considerable success. On 5 April, he took the Orient Lightweight Title in a ten-round points decision against Dencio Cabanella. Cabanella took the first, fifth, and seventh, but Edwards took the remaining seven rounds against his lighter opponent and "pounded Cabanella all over the ring in round ten, having him at his mercy when the final bell rang". He had previously knocked out Edward Duarte on 26 March, in a third round sweep, with vicious one-twos, and two rights to the body that sent his opponent to his knees where he was counted out.

In his last fight in the Philippines, on 9 August 1919, Edwards defeated Iron Bux, in a convincing ninth-round TKO. According to the Manila Daily Bulletin, Edwards handed Bux "the worst licking that he had ever received. Although the Iron Man was never off his feet, he was battered badly, and suffered eyecuts that rendered him nearly helpless by the time that the fight was halted. Edwards was as effective at long range as he had already proved to be at infighting. He showed a clever defense against Bux's attacks." Edwards returned to Australia on 27 August.

For a period in the Philippines, Edwards acted as a boxing advisor to International Boxing Hall of Famer and world flyweight champion Francisco Guilledo (1901-1925), a 5' 1" Filipino, better known under his boxing name Pancho Villa". Guilledo was never knocked out, and found fame when he won his world flyweight title in America in 1922.

=== Boxing decline during brief trip to America ===
On 26 February 1920, a taller, younger, and stronger Richie Mitchell knocked down Edwards in Milwaukee, Wisconsin in the sixth and his handlers threw in the towel before the bell for the seventh. In all, Mitchell floored him for a nine count in the second and sixth, and for a count of two in the third. Though showing his best efforts in the fourth, Edwards could do no damage.

==== Brief return to Britain to box ====
Returning briefly to Britain on 28 May 1920, Edwards faced Johnny Regan at Carbrook, Yorkshire, reversing his loss against Mitchell and winning in the third of twenty rounds. Regrettably for his fans, who had dwindled in his absence during the war, it would be his last British bout. Returning to America on 3 September 1920, Edwards won a ten-round newspaper decision against Johnny Noye at Minneapolis's Nicolete Park. Edwards won with only a slight lead over Noye, a boxer he would have beaten convincingly five years earlier.

Edwards faced Jack Lawler on 30 July 1920, in Milwaukee, winning in a ten-round newspaper decision. In the pre-flight publicity, Edwards was praised for his determination, and for being "of the sort who keeps tearing in. Despite the fact that he was dropped several times by Ritchie Mitchell in their previous bout, Llew arose each time and with a bull-like rush started after the Milwaukee blonde(Mitchell). He is a game ringster." Lawler was described as a mauler, but he showed little of it against Edwards. The bout was described as a slow and uninteresting affair, but after a string of recent fights, both boxers may have been feeling each other out and wary of the other's skills. Lawler was said to stall until the ninth and tenth rounds. In a close bout, Edwards was given the third, fourth, and seventh, with Lawler the fifth and ninth with the rest even. Edwards took the lead throughout the bout, and though he had many of his punches blocked, he landed enough to take the bout.

Edwards remained boxing in the United States through late 1920, when he lost to Clonie Tait at Nicolete Park on 12 November 1920 in a second-round TKO. He was down eleven times before his manager threw in the towel. It appeared clear the Welsh boxer was outclassed, tiring, and facing a painful decline in his boxing career by the end of his American tour.

Edwards career was now clearly in decline but he was in need of cash and needed more fights.

== Return to Australia and career decline ==
On his return to Australia, he defeated French-born Eugene Volaire in a twenty-round points decision in Brisbane on 5 March 1921. On 4 April 1921, in a non-title bout, Edwards defeated Sid Godfrey, a highly rated future Australian lightweight title holder five years younger, in an important twenty round points decision at Sydney Stadium. The Sydney Daily Telegraph called the match, "a contest full of fight with both men displaying a scientific knowledge above the ordinary, speed, punching power and tenacity." Even near the end of his career Edwards could fight with style, but his decline would seem evident against more skilled American competitors on the rise like Harry Stone who had learned the game from tougher New York competitors. Ironically, the following month Godfrey would take the Australian lightweight title from Stone, a boxer with whom Edwards would never defeat again.

== Final loss of the Australian lightweight title to Harry Stone, 1921 ==
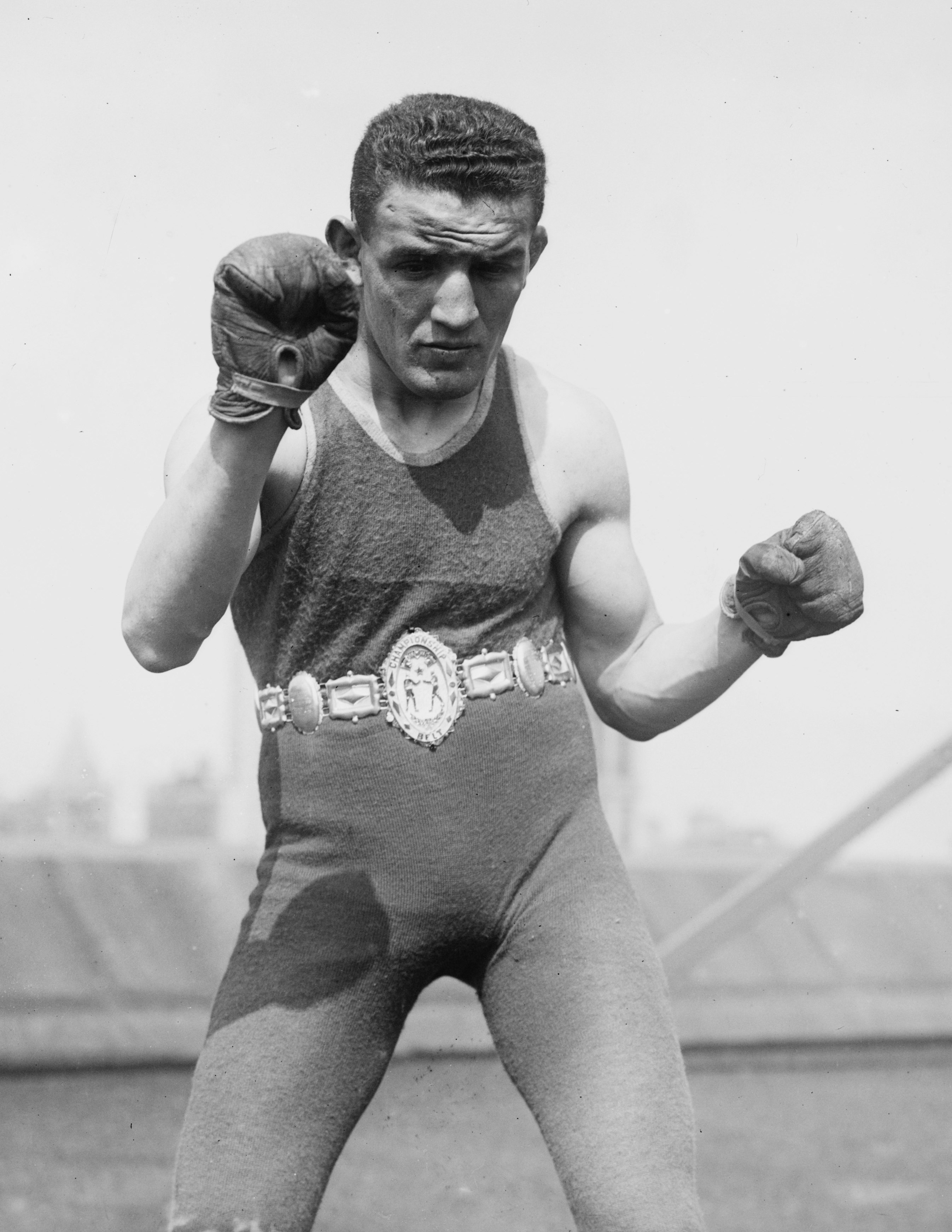
Exceptional New York Lightweight, Harry Stone

Edwards mounted a last defense of the Australian lightweight title before an impressive crowd of 9000 on 23 April 1921 in a twenty-round bout in Melbourne, Australia, against frequent but dangerous rival New York Jewish boxer Harry Stone. Stone had boxed Edwards twice in 1917 in Melbourne and Brisbane with mixed results. Edwards was confused by Stone's ability to quickly retreat in his hopping style after he attacked

Their April 1921 title fight was described as an outstanding show of scientific boxing with both boxers well matched. In fact, both boxers were extremely close in height, reach, and age. Edwards may have suffered from recent travel. Recovering from earlier losses, Edwards seemed to look tired and a bit haggard during the bout, and suffered from a cut over his eye received in the fifth, though he fought with vitality and strength. He had the disadvantage of protecting his eye, which reduced his ability to take the offensive, particularly against Stone's signature left. Stone gained the advantage and was said to have his "hands, feet, and shoulders all working, while the manner in which he bore into his opponent was both interesting and effective". In the seventh, Edwards punished Stones's body against the ropes early in the bout and did better in the infighting, but Stone threw more punches. As late as the eleventh and thirteenth, Edwards landed a few telling blows, but Stone remained in calculated command, and landed more punches. Edwards needed stitches to lacerations in both eyelids later in his dressing room, but his right seemed to have taken the most punishment. The boxers split around 350 English pounds for their efforts. The bout was a difficult loss and it would be the last title match of Edwards's career.

On 12 November 1921, Edwards defeated Jack Suddington in an eleventh round disqualification at Sydney Stadium. Edwards rained blows on Suddington throughout the bout which left his opponent unperturbed, but in the eleventh with his head down and delivering punches to the body, Suddington was called for a foul from a low blow that ended the bout. Suddington, though capable of strong blows, fought very few well-rated opponents, and lacked a winning record.

Edwards dreamed of, but never achieved a shot at the lightweight world title, held at the time by American Benny Leonard, who had wrenched it from fellow Welshman Freddy Welsh. Edwards's slowly fading career, beginning with his vacating the British Empire title, and accelerated by two losses in America, made it evident a shot at the title was unrealistic by 1920. His painful loss to Harry Stone for the Australian title in 1921 removed chances of a world lightweight title shot. Lacking the British title during the war years, when he was in his prime, may have most clearly denied him a shot at the world featherweight title.

On 18 February 1922, Edwards lost to Stone again in a twenty-round points decision at Sydney Stadium. It would be Edwards's last bout, though it was against one of his best opponents.

He died at 71 in Australia in 1965. After his death, he was inducted into the Welsh boxer's Hall of Fame.

== See also ==
- List of British featherweight boxing champions
- Jones, Gareth, The Boxers of Wales: Volume Three, Rhondda (St David's Press, Cardiff, 2012)
