= Paki, California =

Former settlement in California

Paki (also, Paiki and Pake) is a former Maidu settlement in Butte County, California, United States. It was located on Mud Creek near Cusa Lagoon; its precise location is unknown.
