= Johnny Basham =

Welsh boxer (1890–1947)

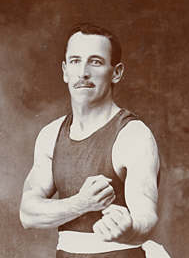
- Basham in 1914

Personal information
- Nickname: Sucker
- Nationality: British
- Born: 13 September 1890 Newport, Monmouthshire, Wales
- Died: 7 June 1947 (aged 56)
- Height: 5 ft 8 in (1.73 m)
- Weight: Welterweight, Middleweight

Boxing career

Boxing record
- Total fights: 84
- Wins: 61
- Win by KO: 24
- Losses: 18
- Draws: 7

John Michael Basham (1890 – 7 June 1947) was a Welsh boxer who became British and European champion at both welter and middleweight. His professional career spanned over 20 years, from 1909 to 1929, and after being stationed in Wrexham through military service, he fought most of his bouts in nearby Liverpool.

Basham was the first welterweight to win the Lonsdale Belt outright, successfully defended his British welterweight title on two occasions and also took the Commonwealth Welterweight title in 1919. His career was defined not only by his successes, but also through the death in the ring of opponent Harry Price, which saw Basham face manslaughter charges, and his failed contests with Ted "Kid" Lewis towards his career's end.

== Boxing career ==
=== Early career ===
Johnny Basham was born in Newport in southern Wales in 1890. BoxRec have his first professional fight against Boxer Ryan on 18 October 1909, fought at Campbell Bannerman Hall in Newport. The six round fight only lasted until the third when Basham took the match via a knockout. He followed this win with a series of regular contests throughout 1910, mainly taking place in Newport or the surrounding areas of Wales. These were against fighters with limited experience, and his results were patchy, having won three, lost three and drawn one by June 1910, including losing to Fred Dyer, the Singing Boxer on Dyer's debut. Only one match is recorded for the second half of 1910, his first fight outside Wales, when he beat Jim Ashen in the first round at the Frank Gess' Pavilion in Gloucester. Basham began 1911 with a draw with Young Walters in Pontnewydd on 6 February. No other bouts are recorded until August, but Basham then undertook a heavy schedule of fights, taking in nine matches in the second half of the year. Basham only lost one of the fights, of which three were fought in Wrexham in north Wales, and two in Liverpool.

In 1912 Basham joined the Royal Welch Fusiliers and was stationed at Hightown Barracks in Wrexham. Over the years he rose through the ranks and achieved the rank of Sergeant. His move to north Wales resulted in most of Basham's fights now occurring either in Wrexham or across the border in Liverpool. Several of his fights were fought at Hightown Barracks or in the Poyser Street drill hall, Wrexham. Of the thirteen matches recorded in 1912, he lost just one, losing to Matt Wells on Boxing Day when he was knocked out in the seventh of a fifteen-round contest.

=== Harry Price and the British Welterweight title ===
During the first half of 1913 Basham experienced a dip in form, losing three and drawing one of the first seven fights. The last of these contests was the first of three consecutive fights against Frank Madole. Basham lost the first encounter with Madole via technical knockout before winning the second by the same result and then taking the third fight on points. He later drew against Tom McCormick at Liverpool Stadium before a win over Will Brooks at the American Skating Rink in Cardiff.

Basham was next scheduled to face South African fighter Harry Price in Liverpool on 21 August 1913. The fight, held at Liverpool Stadium, was scheduled for fifteen three-minute rounds, and in a hotly contested encounter both men traded heavy blows from the start. The Grey River Argus recorded the fight being even up to the ninth, but in the tenth round Basham landed with a left hook that put Price down for a count of nine. Price recovered but in the eleventh he was knocked down again, but when he landed his head made "violent contact with the boards of the ring". Price failed to rise and doctors entered the ring and had him sent to hospital in an unconscious state. Price died the following morning. After the fight Basham was arrested on suspicion of causing grievous bodily harm, and Price's subsequent death led to a manslaughter charge. Basham gained public sympathy for his plight, and he was acquitted when the magistrate in charge of the investigation concluded that the fight had been conducted "fairly and sportingly".

Two months after the Price fight, Basham was back in the ring and finished 1913 with a string of four wins. He began 1914 with a strong win, beating future welterweight champion Albert Badoud by points on New Year's Day. He followed this up with wins over Young Nipper, Dick Nelson and Henri Demlen before fighting for the first time at the National Sporting Club in London, beating Sid Stagg. A win over Gus Platts back in Liverpool led to Basham's first title fight, a contest against Johnny Summers for the British Welterweight belt. Summers, originally from Yorkshire, was a far more experienced boxer with over 140 fights behind him and had held the title in 1912. The bout, fought at the National Sporting Club, was scheduled for twenty rounds; but in the ninth round Summers was stopped via knock-out, giving Basham his first major title.

=== The Lonsdale Belt and the European title ===
Basham was awarded the Lonsdale Belt on 21 December 1914 at the National Sporting Club after winning it from Johnny Summers becoming the first outright winner of the welterweight version of the belt. Tony Lee in his 2009 book All in My Corner, states that "By 1914, Freddie Welsh, Jim Driscoll, Newport's Johnny Basham and Jimmy Wilde had all won the Lonsdale Belts outright;". A Wrexham County Council heritage site records Basham taking the belt both in 1914 and in 1916. The National Library of Wales records Basham winning the Lonsdale Belt in 1916, while The Toronto World newspaper of May 1916 writes that Basham was the holder of the Lonsdale Belt when he faced Badoud in their European title encounter in October 1915.

Basham's career as a professional fighter slowed during the First World War, with Boxrec only recording 13 fights for Basham during the war period. Basham was posted as sergeant physical training officer in the British Expeditionary Force in France, making competitive fighting difficult. Basham was one of a group of fighters, known as 'The Famous Six', who were an elite corps of Army Physical Training Instructors under the command of Captain Bruce Logan. The other five men were Jim Driscoll, Jimmy Wilde, Bombardier Billy Wells, Pat O'Keefe and Dick Smith. At the London Opera House in March 1915, Basham won a 15-round fight "on points" against Matt Wells. In May 1915, Basham fought against Summers in a non-title fight at Liverpool Stadium. The fight went the distance with Basham being given the decision on points. In May 1915 the National Sporting Club arranged Basham's first defence of his welterweight title, his opponent being Tom McCormick who had held the title briefly in 1914. The twenty round fight lasted until the thirteenth when Basham stopped McMormick through a technical knockout. Basham knocked out Dan Roberts during the seventh round at a 13 August fight in Liverpool. On 22 October 1915, a fight was arranged for the vacant EBU (European) welterweight title between Basham and Swiss fighter Albert Badoud. Basham has fought Badoud twice previously, both ending in wins for the Welshman, but in the title encounter Badoud stopped Basham through a ninth-round knockout.

In 1916 Basham defended his British title for the second time, again at the National Sporting Club in Covent Garden, facing Scotsman Eddie Beattie. The match went as far as the nineteenth before Beattie was stopped via a technical knockout. Basham fought sporadically throughout the rest of the war years, mainly in Liverpool. Basham won over Sid Burns in May 1917 in Holborn, London. In December 1918, Balsham beat private A. Tierney at the British Empire and American Services Boxing Tournament held at the Royal Albert Hall.

On 27 January 1919, with the war behind him, Basham was again invited to the National Sporting Club where he beat American fighter Eddie Shevlin, who was introduced as the U.S. Navy's Welterweight Champion, after 15 rounds. Basham won on points, and after beating Kid Doyle in February, he was called for a rematch at Covent Garden against Shevlin, where Basham again won with a points decision. He followed this with a draw against American Augie Ratner and then a win over London fighter Willie Farrell on 22 July in Liverpool, which opened up another shot at the European Welterweight title.

Albert Badoud had successfully defended the European Welterweight title in August 1919, against Frenchman Francis Charles, but by the following month he had vacated the title, which allowed both Charles and Basham to contest the welterweight belt. The fight was arranged for 2 September at the Olympia in London and was scheduled for 20 three-minute rounds. The bout went the full distance, with the result going to Basham on points, making him the European Welterweight Champion.

=== European Middleweight title and Ted "Kid" Lewis ===
In November 1919, a contest was arranged between Basham and Matt Wells, who had knocked Basham out when they met in Swansea in 1912. At stake were Basham's British Welterweight title and Wells' Commonwealth Welterweight title, which he had taken from Tom McCormick in an encounter in Sydney in 1914. Basham won the fight on points, making him the British, Commonwealth and European Welterweight Champion. He then successfully defended his Commonwealth belt from a challenge from Australian Welterweight champion Fred Kay, before facing former World Welterweight Champion Ted "Kid" Lewis on 9 June 1920. Lewis, who had three months prior taken the vacant British middleweight title, challenged for all three of Basham's belts, in a contest held at the Olympia in Kensington. The more experienced Lewis won the contest in the ninth through a technical knockout (from cutting Basham's lip), taking Basham's titles.

Five months later, Basham was given an opportunity to challenge Lewis for the British and European titles he had lost in their first encounter. Contested at the Royal Albert Hall in London, Basham lasted until the nineteenth round when he was knocked out by Lewis. By 1921, Lewis had moved up to Middleweight, and Basham responded by doing the same. Gus Platts, a Sheffield fighter who had beaten Basham in Cardiff in 1911, was the present holder of both the British and European Middleweight titles, having won them respectively from Tom Gummer and Ercole de Balzac earlier in the year. Basham was allowed the first challenge for the two titles and faced Platts on 31 May 1921 at the Royal Albert Hall. The twenty round fight went the full distance and Basham was awarded the contest on points, becoming the new British and European Middleweight champion.

Basham held the Middleweight titles for less than five months, losing both to his arch-rival "Kid" Lewis when the two met in October 1921. Again Basham was unable to last the distance, being stopped by technical knockout in the twelfth. Basham never challenged for a title again and he ended his career with a series of losses, being knocked out by World Champion Mike McTigue and a points loss to fellow Welshman Jerry Shea. Basham came out of retirement in 1929 to face "Kid" Lewis, but for the fourth time he was stopped within the distance.

Basham reportedly suffered from "cauliflower ear", or thickening and enlargement of his left ear, in his retirement due to trauma from boxing. Basham died on 7 June 1947, aged 56.

== Bibliography ==
- Lee, Tony (2009). All in My Corner: A tribute to some forgotten Welsh boxing heroes. Ammanford: TL Associates. ISBN 978-0-9564456-0-5.
