= Mike Glover (boxer) =

American boxer

Personal information
- Nickname: Michael J. Cavanaugh
- Nationality: American
- Born: December 18, 1890 Lawrence, Massachusetts
- Died: July 11, 1917 (aged 26) Middleboro, Massachusetts
- Height: 5 ft 9 in (1.75 m)
- Weight: Welterweight

Boxing career
- Stance: Orthodox

Boxing record
- Total fights: 94
- Wins: 63
- Win by KO: 16
- Losses: 15
- Draws: 15
- No contests: 1

Mike Glover (December 18, 1890 – July 11, 1917) was an American boxer who briefly held the World Welterweight Championship in June 1915. His claim to the title was subsequently recognized by the World Boxing Association.

== Early boxing career ==
By the spring of 1908, Glover had begun his boxing career defeating Harry Phillips, Harry Lortz, Red Shaw, Jim Gardner, Joe Sells, and Tony Bender. On May 25, 1908, he lost to the great Leach Cross in a fourth round disqualification. He lost to Frankie Madden in a fourth-round knockout in New York, on December 18, one of his last fights that year. He lost few fights in 1909, finally succumbing to Harlem Tommy Murphey by newspaper decision at the Sharkey Athletic Club in New York, though lasting ten rounds with the seasoned boxer on May 5, 1909. For the remainder of 1909 and 1910, he beat accomplished boxers Young Nitchie, Willie Moody, Jeff Doherty, and Marty Rowan twice. On January 28, 1911, he fought the great future World Junior Heavyweight Champion Battling Levinsky in a close six-round bout in Philadelphia.

On May 22, 1911, Glover lost to Buck Crouse at Duquesne Garden in Pittsburgh in a six-round newspaper decision by the Pittsburgh Post. The Gazette Times agreed with the ruling, emphasizing that shrewd boxing technique was Glover's strength. It wrote, "Glover is one of the cleverest boys that has come to this city since the boxing game started..."

== Claiming the Welterweight Championship of the world ==
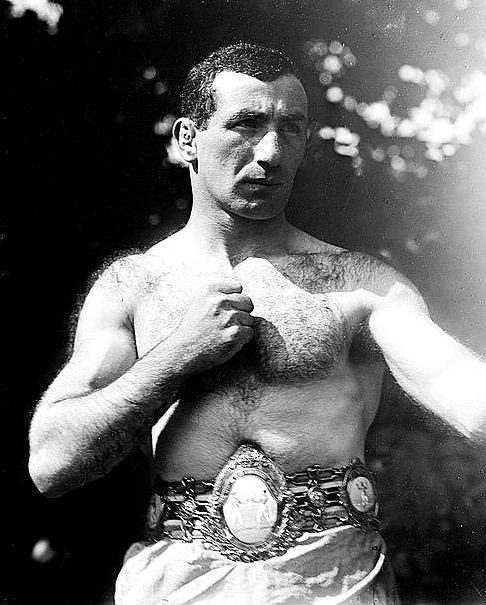
Matt Wells, British Welterweight Champion

On June 1, 1915, Glover defeated Matt Wells in a points decision at the Atlas Athletic Club in Boston in twelve rounds with Patsy Haley as referee. He held the title only three weeks, losing it to the famed Jack Britton at the same location in a twelve-round points decision.

As was often the case during these years, Glover had attempted to claim the World Title on more than one occasion, first in Boston when he defeated Marcel Thomas, holder of the European World Welterweight title in a TKO on July 22, 1913. He also claimed to have first defended the title four months later against Jack Britton on November 27, 1913, winning in a ten-round newspaper decision in Brooklyn.

Glover fought Ted "Kid" Lewis at least three times, winning only once, however in a twelve-round points decision in front of a thrilled hometown Boston crowd at the Atlas Athletic Association. The Evening World wrote, "Mike Glover, the South Boston welterweight gave the local fans one of the biggest surprises of the season last night by getting the decision over Ted Lewis."

== End of career, premature death ==
While Glover was training for a second bout with Ted "Kid" Lewis, he took ill with a serious cold. Though continuing to get worse, he went through with strenuous training for the fight, and fought the fight as well. He had to be confined to bed after his loss to Lewis, and finally was rushed to a hospital near death. Glover died in Middleboro on July 11, 1917, while still at the height of his career, only living to age twenty-six. He was survived by his wife and one-year-old daughter. The Reading Eagle noted that "he was at one time considered by many sporting writers as the welterweight champion of the country."

== Professional boxing record ==
All information in this section is derived from BoxRec, unless otherwise stated.

=== Official Record ===
94 fights	30 wins	5 losses
By knockout	16	1
By decision	12	3
By disqualification	2	1
Draws	5	
No contests	1	
Newspaper decisions/draws	53	

All newspaper decisions are officially regarded as “no decision” bouts and are not counted in the win/loss/draw column.

No.	Result	Record	Opponent	Type	Round	Date	Location	Notes
94	Loss	30–5–5 (54)	Ted 'Kid' Lewis	PTS	12	Jun 13, 1916	Arena (Armory A.A.), Boston, Massachusetts, U.S.	
93	Draw	30–4–5 (54)	Joe Eagan	PTS	12	Mar 21, 1916	Armory A.A., Boston, Massachusetts, U.S.	
92	Win	30–4–4 (54)	Billy Kramer	TKO	10 (10)	Jan 7, 1916	Auditorium, Milwaukee, Wisconsin, U.S.	
91	ND	29–4–4 (54)	Joe Chick	ND	12	Jan 3, 1916	Lenox A.C., Gloucester, Massachusetts, U.S.	According to Boston Globe this was a No Decision bout
90	Win	29–4–4 (53)	Bay Wood	PTS	12	Dec 17, 1915	Manchester, New Hampshire, U.S.	
89	Win	28–4–4 (53)	Soldier Bartfield	PTS	12	Dec 14, 1915	Arena (Atlas A.A.), Boston, Massachusetts, U.S.	
88	Win	27–4–4 (53)	Ted 'Kid' Lewis	PTS	12	Nov 30, 1915	Arena (Atlas A.A.), Boston, Massachusetts, U.S.	
87	Win	26–4–4 (53)	Johnny Alberts	PTS	12	Nov 8, 1915	Lenox A.C., Gloucester, Massachusetts, U.S.	
86	Win	25–4–4 (53)	Silent Martin	PTS	12	Sep 23, 1915	Meadowbrook Field, North Adams, Massachusetts, U.S.	
85	Win	24–4–4 (53)	Leo Grady	KO	7 (12)	Aug 19, 1915	Western Gateway A.C., North Adams, Massachusetts, U.S.	
84	Loss	23–4–4 (53)	Ted 'Kid' Lewis	PTS	12	Aug 3, 1915	Arena (Atlas A.A.), Boston, Massachusetts, U.S.	
83	Loss	23–3–4 (53)	Jack Britton	PTS	12	Jun 22, 1915	Arena (Atlas A.A.), Boston, Massachusetts, U.S.	Lost world welterweight title
82	Win	23–2–4 (53)	Matt Wells	PTS	12	Jun 1, 1915	Arena (Atlas A.A.), Boston, Massachusetts, U.S.	Retained world welterweight title claim; Won world welterweight title
81	Win	22–2–4 (53)	Joe Uvanni	KO	6 (10)	Apr 19, 1915	Lenox A.C., Gloucester, Massachusetts, U.S.	
80	Draw	21–2–4 (53)	Heywood Briggs	PTS	10	Feb 22, 1915	Lenox A.C., Gloucester, Massachusetts, U.S.	
79	Win	21–2–3 (53)	Battling Downey	KO	3 (10)	Feb 22, 1915	Lenox A.C., Gloucester, Massachusetts, U.S.	
78	Win	20–2–3 (53)	Heywood Briggs	PTS	10	Feb 5, 1915	Only A.C., North Abington, Massachusetts, U.S.	
77	Win	19–2–3 (53)	K.O. Sweeney	NWS	10	Oct 29, 1914	Auditorium, Waterbury, Connecticut, U.S.	
76	Draw	19–2–3 (52)	Bill Fleming	NWS	12	Sep 25, 1914	Old Town, Maine, U.S.	
75	Win	19–2–3 (51)	Young Hickey	NWS	10	Aug 15, 1914	St. Nicholas Arena, New York City, New York, U.S.	
74	Loss	19–2–3 (50)	Kid Graves	NWS	10	Jul 7, 1914	Broadway Arena, New York City, New York, U.S.	
73	Win	19–2–3 (49)	Al Britton	PTS	12	Jun 5, 1914	University A.C., Cambridge, Massachusetts, U.S.	
72	Win	18–2–3 (49)	Bill Fleming	PTS	12	May 27, 1914	Lakeside A.C., Webster, Massachusetts, U.S.	
71	Win	17–2–3 (49)	Heywood Briggs	PTS	10	Apr 17, 1914	Social Club, North Abington, Massachusetts, U.S.	
70	Loss	16–2–3 (49)	Jack Britton	NWS	10	Jan 19, 1914	New Amsterdam Opera House, New York City, New York, U.S.	World welterweight title claim at stake; (via KO only)
69	Win	16–2–3 (48)	Jack Britton	NWS	10	Nov 27, 1913	Irving A.C., New York City, New York, U.S.	World welterweight title claim at stake; (via KO only)
68	Win	16–2–3 (47)	Bill Fleming	NWS	10	Oct 25, 1913	Irving A.C., New York City, New York, U.S.	
67	Loss	16–2–3 (46)	Kid Graves	NWS	10	Oct 13, 1913	Irving A.C., New York City, New York, U.S.	
66	Draw	16–2–3 (45)	Young Denny	NWS	10	Sep 29, 1913	Orleans A.C., New Orleans, Louisiana, U.S.	
65	Win	16–2–3 (44)	Paddy Sullivan	KO	7 (10)	Aug 5, 1913	Atlantic A.A., Rockaway Beach, New York City, New York, U.S.	
64	Win	15–2–3 (44)	Marcel Thomas	TKO	4 (10)	Jul 22, 1913	Arena (Atlas A.A.), Boston, Massachusetts, U.S.	Won world welterweight title claim
63	Win	14–2–3 (44)	Young Hickey	NWS	10	Jul 16, 1913	St. Nicholas Arena, New York City, New York, U.S.	
62	Win	14–2–3 (43)	Gus Platts	NWS	10	Jul 9, 1913	St. Nicholas Arena, New York City, New York, U.S.	
61	Win	14–2–3 (42)	Italian Joe Gans	NWS	10	Jun 21, 1913	Gowanus A.C., New York City, New York, U.S.	
60	Loss	14–2–3 (41)	Tommy Maloney	NWS	10	Jun 7, 1913	Irving A.C., New York City, New York, U.S.	
59	Win	14–2–3 (40)	Young Tommy Coleman	NWS	10	Dec 12, 1912	Sharkey A.C., New York City, New York, U.S.	
58	Win	14–2–3 (39)	Young Tommy Coleman	NWS	10	Nov 22, 1912	Sharkey A.C., New York City, New York, U.S.	
57	Win	14–2–3 (38)	Fighting Zunner	NWS	10	Oct 15, 1912	Convention Hall, Buffalo, New York, U.S.	
56	Loss	14–2–3 (37)	Jeff Smith	NWS	10	Jun 6, 1912	Brown's Gym, New York City, New York, U.S.	
55	Win	14–2–3 (36)	Charley Victor	TKO	6 (10)	Apr 9, 1912	Brown's Gym, New York City, New York, U.S.	
54	Win	13–2–3 (36)	Young Hickey	NWS	10	Mar 25, 1912	Gaiety Theater, Albany, New York, U.S.	
53	Win	13–2–3 (35)	Harry Duncan	DQ	13 (15)	Feb 8, 1912	Pitfield Street Baths, Hoxton, London, England	
52	Draw	12–2–3 (35)	Harry Mathieson	PTS	10	Jan 21, 1912	Wonderland, Paris, Paris, France	
51	Win	12–2–2 (35)	Young Johnny Johnson	PTS	10	Jan 6, 1912	Wonderland, Paris, Paris, France	
50	Win	11–2–2 (35)	Joe Kastner	KO	1 (10)	Nov 4, 1911	New Amsterdam Opera House, New York City, New York, U.S.	
49	Win	10–2–2 (35)	Pat Breslin	NWS	10	Nov 1, 1911	Long Acre A.C., New York City, New York, U.S.	
48	Win	10–2–2 (34)	Jock Simcoe	TKO	7 (10)	Oct 18, 1911	Liberal A.C., New York City, New York, U.S.	
47	Loss	9–2–2 (34)	Buck Crouse	NWS	6	May 22, 1911	Duquesne Garden, Pittsburgh, Pennsylvania, U.S.	
46	Win	9–2–2 (33)	Frank Perron	NWS	6	Apr 24, 1911	American A.C., Philadelphia, Pennsylvania, U.S.	
45	Win	9–2–2 (32)	Harry Ramsey	NWS	6	Apr 10, 1911	American A.C., Philadelphia, Pennsylvania, U.S.	
44	Draw	9–2–2 (31)	Battling Levinsky	NWS	6	Apr 3, 1911	American A.C., Philadelphia, Pennsylvania, U.S.	
43	Win	9–2–2 (30)	Peck Miller	NWS	6	Mar 18, 1911	National A.C., Philadelphia, Pennsylvania, U.S.	
42	Win	9–2–2 (29)	Young Erne	NWS	6	Mar 4, 1911	American A.C., Philadelphia, Pennsylvania, U.S.	
41	Draw	9–2–2 (28)	Jack Dillon	NWS	6	Feb 4, 1911	Old City Hall, Pittsburgh, Pennsylvania, U.S.	
40	Draw	9–2–2 (27)	Battling Levinsky	NWS	6	Jan 28, 1911	American A.C., Philadelphia, Pennsylvania, U.S.	
39	Draw	9–2–2 (26)	Dick Nelson	PTS	15	Dec 12, 1910	Casino, New Haven, Connecticut, U.S.	
38	Loss	9–2–1 (26)	Ted Nelson	NWS	10	Nov 23, 1910	Sharkey A.C., New York City, New York, U.S.	
37	Win	9–2–1 (25)	Willie Howard	TKO	5 (10)	Jul 22, 1910	Atlantic A.A., Rockaway Beach, New York City, New York, U.S.	
36	Win	8–2–1 (25)	Harry Ferns	DQ	7 (10)	Apr 6, 1910	Sharkey A.C., New York City, New York, U.S.	
35	Win	7–2–1 (25)	Marty Rowan	NWS	10	Mar 28, 1910	Spindle City A.C., Cohoes, New York, U.S.	
34	Win	7–2–1 (24)	Billy Leary	NWS	10	Mar 22, 1910	Brown's Gym, New York City, New York, U.S.	
33	Win	7–2–1 (23)	Jeff Doherty	PTS	15	Mar 10, 1910	Clinton A.C., New Haven, Connecticut, U.S.	
32	Loss	6–2–1 (23)	Johnny Dohan	NWS	10	Feb 22, 1910	Brown's Gym, New York City, New York, U.S.	
31	Win	6–2–1 (22)	Charley Sieger	NWS	10	Feb 8, 1910	Brown's Gym, New York City, New York, U.S.	
30	Win	6–2–1 (21)	Willie Moody	NWS	6	Jan 29, 1910	National A.C., Philadelphia, Pennsylvania, U.S.	
29	Win	6–2–1 (20)	Billy Donovan	NWS	6	Jan 22, 1910	National A.C., Philadelphia, Pennsylvania, U.S.	
28	Win	6–2–1 (19)	Marty Rowan	NWS	10	Jan 18, 1910	Brown's Gym, New York City, New York, U.S.	
27	Win	6–2–1 (18)	Dodo Maher	KO	9 (10)	Dec 13, 1909	Walden, New York, U.S.	
26	Win	5–2–1 (18)	Young Nitchie	NWS	6	Nov 12, 1909	Nonpareil A.C., Philadelphia, Pennsylvania, U.S.	
25	Win	5–2–1 (17)	Jack Curley	NWS	10	May 31, 1909	Olympia Boxing Club, New York City, New York, U.S.	
24	Loss	5–2–1 (16)	Harlem Tommy Murphy	NWS	10	May 5, 1909	Sharkey A.C., New York City, New York, U.S.	
23	Win	5–2–1 (15)	Billy Herman	NWS	10	Apr 19, 1909	Olympia Boxing Club, New York City, New York, U.S.	
22	Win	5–2–1 (14)	Jack Smith	NWS	10	Apr 10, 1909	National S.C., New York City, New York, U.S.	
21	Win	5–2–1 (13)	Eddie Carter	NWS	10	Feb 23, 1909	Brown's Gym, New York City, New York, U.S.	
20	Draw	5–2–1 (12)	Harry Powers	NWS	10	Feb 13, 1909	National A.C., New York City, New York, U.S.	
19	Win	5–2–1 (11)	Peck Miller	NWS	6	Jan 30, 1909	National A.C., Philadelphia, Pennsylvania, U.S.	
18	Win	5–2–1 (10)	Jersey Tom Murphy	KO	3 (6)	Jan 23, 1909	National A.C., New York City, New York, U.S.	
17	Draw	4–2–1 (10)	Billy Willis	NWS	6	Jan 19, 1909	Reading A.C., Reading, Pennsylvania, U.S.	
16	Draw	4–2–1 (9)	Fred Sidney	PTS	8	Jan 5, 1909	Armory, Boston, Massachusetts, U.S.	
15	Loss	4–2 (9)	Frankie Madden	KO	5 (6)	Dec 18, 1908	National A.C., New York City, New York, U.S.	
14	Win	4–1 (9)	Fred Corbett	NWS	6	Oct 24, 1908	National A.C., Philadelphia, Pennsylvania, U.S.	
13	Win	4–1 (8)	Tony Bender	NWS	6	Oct 6, 1908	Brown's Gym, New York City, New York, U.S.	
12	Win	4–1 (7)	Charley Miller	KO	5 (6)	Oct 3, 1908	National A.C., Philadelphia, Pennsylvania, U.S.	
11	Draw	3–1 (7)	Harry Scroggs	NWS	6	Sep 22, 1908	Brown's Gym, New York City, New York, U.S.	
10	Loss	3–1 (6)	Leach Cross	DQ	4 (6)	May 25, 1908	Dry Dock A.C., New York City, New York, U.S.	
9	Win	3–0 (6)	Tony Bender	NWS	6	Apr 28, 1908	Brown's Gym, New York City, New York, U.S.	
8	Win	3–0 (5)	Joe Sells	NWS	6	Apr 21, 1908	The Masonic Temple, New York City, New York, U.S.	
7	Draw	3–0 (4)	Marty Rowan	NWS	6	Apr 18, 1908	National A.C., New York City, New York, U.S.	
6	Draw	3–0 (3)	George Hoey	NWS	4	Apr 6, 1908	Dry Dock A.C., New York City, New York, U.S.	
5	Win	3–0 (2)	Jim Gardner	TKO	3 (6)	Mar 31, 1908	Brown's Gym, New York City, New York, U.S.	
4	Win	2–0 (2)	Red Shaw	TKO	3 (6)	Mar 17, 1908	Brown's Gym, New York City, New York, U.S.	
3	Win	1–0 (2)	Harry Lortz	NWS	6	Mar 14, 1908	National A.C., New York City, New York, U.S.	
2	Win	1–0 (1)	Harry Phillips	TKO	2 (4)	Mar 12, 1908	Long Acre A.C., New York City, New York, U.S.	
1	Loss	0–0 (1)	Babe Cullen	NWS	4	Mar 2, 1908	Dry Dock A.C., New York City, New York, U.S.	

=== Unofficial Record ===
94 fights	63 wins	15 losses
By knockout	16	1
By decision	45	13
By disqualification	2	1
Draws	15	
No contests	1	

Record with the inclusion of newspaper decisions in the win/loss/draw column.

No.	Result	Record	Opponent	Type	Round	Date	Location	Notes
94	Loss	63–15–15 (1)	Ted 'Kid' Lewis	PTS	12	Jun 13, 1916	Arena (Armory A.A.), Boston, Massachusetts, U.S.	
93	Draw	63–14–15 (1)	Joe Eagan	PTS	12	Mar 21, 1916	Armory A.A., Boston, Massachusetts, U.S.	
92	Win	63–14–14 (1)	Billy Kramer	TKO	10 (10)	Jan 7, 1916	Auditorium, Milwaukee, Wisconsin, U.S.	
91	ND	62–14–14 (1)	Joe Chick	ND	12	Jan 3, 1916	Lenox A.C., Gloucester, Massachusetts, U.S.	According to Boston Globe this was a No Decision bout
90	Win	62–14–14	Bay Wood	PTS	12	Dec 17, 1915	Manchester, New Hampshire, U.S.	
89	Win	61–14–14	Soldier Bartfield	PTS	12	Dec 14, 1915	Arena (Atlas A.A.), Boston, Massachusetts, U.S.	
88	Win	60–14–14	Ted 'Kid' Lewis	PTS	12	Nov 30, 1915	Arena (Atlas A.A.), Boston, Massachusetts, U.S.	
87	Win	59–14–14	Johnny Alberts	PTS	12	Nov 8, 1915	Lenox A.C., Gloucester, Massachusetts, U.S.	
86	Win	58–14–14	Silent Martin	PTS	12	Sep 23, 1915	Meadowbrook Field, North Adams, Massachusetts, U.S.	
85	Win	57–14–14	Leo Grady	KO	7 (12)	Aug 19, 1915	Western Gateway A.C., North Adams, Massachusetts, U.S.	
84	Loss	56–14–14	Ted 'Kid' Lewis	PTS	12	Aug 3, 1915	Arena (Atlas A.A.), Boston, Massachusetts, U.S.	
83	Loss	56–13–14	Jack Britton	PTS	12	Jun 22, 1915	Arena (Atlas A.A.), Boston, Massachusetts, U.S.	Lost world welterweight title
82	Win	56–12–14	Matt Wells	PTS	12	Jun 1, 1915	Arena (Atlas A.A.), Boston, Massachusetts, U.S.	Retained world welterweight title claim; Won world welterweight title
81	Win	55–12–14	Joe Uvanni	KO	6 (10)	Apr 19, 1915	Lenox A.C., Gloucester, Massachusetts, U.S.	
80	Draw	54–12–14	Heywood Briggs	PTS	10	Feb 22, 1915	Lenox A.C., Gloucester, Massachusetts, U.S.	
79	Win	54–12–13	Battling Downey	KO	3 (10)	Feb 22, 1915	Lenox A.C., Gloucester, Massachusetts, U.S.	
78	Win	53–12–13	Heywood Briggs	PTS	10	Feb 5, 1915	Only A.C., North Abington, Massachusetts, U.S.	
77	Win	52–12–13	K.O. Sweeney	NWS	10	Oct 29, 1914	Auditorium, Waterbury, Connecticut, U.S.	
76	Draw	51–12–13	Bill Fleming	NWS	12	Sep 25, 1914	Old Town, Maine, U.S.	
75	Win	51–12–12	Young Hickey	NWS	10	Aug 15, 1914	St. Nicholas Arena, New York City, New York, U.S.	
74	Loss	50–12–12	Kid Graves	NWS	10	Jul 7, 1914	Broadway Arena, New York City, New York, U.S.	
73	Win	50–11–12	Al Britton	PTS	12	Jun 5, 1914	University A.C., Cambridge, Massachusetts, U.S.	
72	Win	49–11–12	Bill Fleming	PTS	12	May 27, 1914	Lakeside A.C., Webster, Massachusetts, U.S.	
71	Win	48–11–12	Heywood Briggs	PTS	10	Apr 17, 1914	Social Club, North Abington, Massachusetts, U.S.	
70	Loss	47–11–12	Jack Britton	NWS	10	Jan 19, 1914	New Amsterdam Opera House, New York City, New York, U.S.	World welterweight title claim at stake; (via KO only)
69	Win	47–10–12	Jack Britton	NWS	10	Nov 27, 1913	Irving A.C., New York City, New York, U.S.	World welterweight title claim at stake; (via KO only)
68	Win	46–10–12	Bill Fleming	NWS	10	Oct 25, 1913	Irving A.C., New York City, New York, U.S.	
67	Loss	45–10–12	Kid Graves	NWS	10	Oct 13, 1913	Irving A.C., New York City, New York, U.S.	
66	Draw	45–9–12	Young Denny	NWS	10	Sep 29, 1913	Orleans A.C., New Orleans, Louisiana, U.S.	
65	Win	45–9–11	Paddy Sullivan	KO	7 (10)	Aug 5, 1913	Atlantic A.A., Rockaway Beach, New York City, New York, U.S.	
64	Win	44–9–11	Marcel Thomas	TKO	4 (10)	Jul 22, 1913	Arena (Atlas A.A.), Boston, Massachusetts, U.S.	Won world welterweight title claim
63	Win	43–9–11	Young Hickey	NWS	10	Jul 16, 1913	St. Nicholas Arena, New York City, New York, U.S.	
62	Win	42–9–11	Gus Platts	NWS	10	Jul 9, 1913	St. Nicholas Arena, New York City, New York, U.S.	
61	Win	41–9–11	Italian Joe Gans	NWS	10	Jun 21, 1913	Gowanus A.C., New York City, New York, U.S.	
60	Loss	40–9–11	Tommy Maloney	NWS	10	Jun 7, 1913	Irving A.C., New York City, New York, U.S.	
59	Win	40–8–11	Young Tommy Coleman	NWS	10	Dec 12, 1912	Sharkey A.C., New York City, New York, U.S.	
58	Win	39–8–11	Young Tommy Coleman	NWS	10	Nov 22, 1912	Sharkey A.C., New York City, New York, U.S.	
57	Win	38–8–11	Fighting Zunner	NWS	10	Oct 15, 1912	Convention Hall, Buffalo, New York, U.S.	
56	Loss	37–8–11	Jeff Smith	NWS	10	Jun 6, 1912	Brown's Gym, New York City, New York, U.S.	
55	Win	37–7–11	Charley Victor	TKO	6 (10)	Apr 9, 1912	Brown's Gym, New York City, New York, U.S.	
54	Win	36–7–11	Young Hickey	NWS	10	Mar 25, 1912	Gaiety Theater, Albany, New York, U.S.	
53	Win	35–7–11	Harry Duncan	DQ	13 (15)	Feb 8, 1912	Pitfield Street Baths, Hoxton, London, England	
52	Draw	34–7–11	Harry Mathieson	PTS	10	Jan 21, 1912	Wonderland, Paris, Paris, France	
51	Win	34–7–10	Young Johnny Johnson	PTS	10	Jan 6, 1912	Wonderland, Paris, Paris, France	
50	Win	33–7–10	Joe Kastner	KO	1 (10)	Nov 4, 1911	New Amsterdam Opera House, New York City, New York, U.S.	
49	Win	32–7–10	Pat Breslin	NWS	10	Nov 1, 1911	Long Acre A.C., New York City, New York, U.S.	
48	Win	31–7–10	Jock Simcoe	TKO	7 (10)	Oct 18, 1911	Liberal A.C., New York City, New York, U.S.	
47	Loss	30–7–10	Buck Crouse	NWS	6	May 22, 1911	Duquesne Garden, Pittsburgh, Pennsylvania, U.S.	
46	Win	30–6–10	Frank Perron	NWS	6	Apr 24, 1911	American A.C., Philadelphia, Pennsylvania, U.S.	
45	Win	29–6–10	Harry Ramsey	NWS	6	Apr 10, 1911	American A.C., Philadelphia, Pennsylvania, U.S.	
44	Draw	28–6–10	Battling Levinsky	NWS	6	Apr 3, 1911	American A.C., Philadelphia, Pennsylvania, U.S.	
43	Win	28–6–9	Peck Miller	NWS	6	Mar 18, 1911	National A.C., Philadelphia, Pennsylvania, U.S.	
42	Win	27–6–9	Young Erne	NWS	6	Mar 4, 1911	American A.C., Philadelphia, Pennsylvania, U.S.	
41	Draw	26–6–9	Jack Dillon	NWS	6	Feb 4, 1911	Old City Hall, Pittsburgh, Pennsylvania, U.S.	
40	Draw	26–6–8	Battling Levinsky	NWS	6	Jan 28, 1911	American A.C., Philadelphia, Pennsylvania, U.S.	
39	Draw	26–6–7	Dick Nelson	PTS	15	Dec 12, 1910	Casino, New Haven, Connecticut, U.S.	
38	Loss	26–6–6	Ted Nelson	NWS	10	Nov 23, 1910	Sharkey A.C., New York City, New York, U.S.	
37	Win	26–5–6	Willie Howard	TKO	5 (10)	Jul 22, 1910	Atlantic A.A., Rockaway Beach, New York City, New York, U.S.	
36	Win	25–5–6	Harry Ferns	DQ	7 (10)	Apr 6, 1910	Sharkey A.C., New York City, New York, U.S.	
35	Win	24–5–6	Marty Rowan	NWS	10	Mar 28, 1910	Spindle City A.C., Cohoes, New York, U.S.	
34	Win	23–5–6	Billy Leary	NWS	10	Mar 22, 1910	Brown's Gym, New York City, New York, U.S.	
33	Win	22–5–6	Jeff Doherty	PTS	15	Mar 10, 1910	Clinton A.C., New Haven, Connecticut, U.S.	
32	Loss	21–5–6	Johnny Dohan	NWS	10	Feb 22, 1910	Brown's Gym, New York City, New York, U.S.	
31	Win	21–4–6	Charley Sieger	NWS	10	Feb 8, 1910	Brown's Gym, New York City, New York, U.S.	
30	Win	20–4–6	Willie Moody	NWS	6	Jan 29, 1910	National A.C., Philadelphia, Pennsylvania, U.S.	
29	Win	19–4–6	Billy Donovan	NWS	6	Jan 22, 1910	National A.C., Philadelphia, Pennsylvania, U.S.	
28	Win	18–4–6	Marty Rowan	NWS	10	Jan 18, 1910	Brown's Gym, New York City, New York, U.S.	
27	Win	17–4–6	Dodo Maher	KO	9 (10)	Dec 13, 1909	Walden, New York, U.S.	
26	Win	16–4–6	Young Nitchie	NWS	6	Nov 12, 1909	Nonpareil A.C., Philadelphia, Pennsylvania, U.S.	
25	Win	15–4–6	Jack Curley	NWS	10	May 31, 1909	Olympia Boxing Club, New York City, New York, U.S.	
24	Loss	14–4–6	Harlem Tommy Murphy	NWS	10	May 5, 1909	Sharkey A.C., New York City, New York, U.S.	
23	Win	14–3–6	Billy Herman	NWS	10	Apr 19, 1909	Olympia Boxing Club, New York City, New York, U.S.	
22	Win	13–3–6	Jack Smith	NWS	10	Apr 10, 1909	National S.C., New York City, New York, U.S.	
21	Win	12–3–6	Eddie Carter	NWS	10	Feb 23, 1909	Brown's Gym, New York City, New York, U.S.	
20	Draw	11–3–6	Harry Powers	NWS	10	Feb 13, 1909	National A.C., New York City, New York, U.S.	
19	Win	11–3–5	Peck Miller	NWS	6	Jan 30, 1909	National A.C., Philadelphia, Pennsylvania, U.S.	
18	Win	10–3–5	Jersey Tom Murphy	KO	3 (6)	Jan 23, 1909	National A.C., New York City, New York, U.S.	
17	Draw	9–3–5	Billy Willis	NWS	6	Jan 19, 1909	Reading A.C., Reading, Pennsylvania, U.S.	
16	Draw	9–3–4	Fred Sidney	PTS	8	Jan 5, 1909	Armory, Boston, Massachusetts, U.S.	
15	Loss	9–3–3	Frankie Madden	KO	5 (6)	Dec 18, 1908	National A.C., New York City, New York, U.S.	
14	Win	9–2–3	Fred Corbett	NWS	6	Oct 24, 1908	National A.C., Philadelphia, Pennsylvania, U.S.	
13	Win	8–2–3	Tony Bender	NWS	6	Oct 6, 1908	Brown's Gym, New York City, New York, U.S.	
12	Win	7–2–3	Charley Miller	KO	5 (6)	Oct 3, 1908	National A.C., Philadelphia, Pennsylvania, U.S.	
11	Draw	6–2–3	Harry Scroggs	NWS	6	Sep 22, 1908	Brown's Gym, New York City, New York, U.S.	
10	Loss	6–2–2	Leach Cross	DQ	4 (6)	May 25, 1908	Dry Dock A.C., New York City, New York, U.S.	
9	Win	6–1–2	Tony Bender	NWS	6	Apr 28, 1908	Brown's Gym, New York City, New York, U.S.	
8	Win	5–1–2	Joe Sells	NWS	6	Apr 21, 1908	The Masonic Temple, New York City, New York, U.S.	
7	Draw	4–1–2	Marty Rowan	NWS	6	Apr 18, 1908	National A.C., New York City, New York, U.S.	
6	Draw	4–1–1	George Hoey	NWS	4	Apr 6, 1908	Dry Dock A.C., New York City, New York, U.S.	
5	Win	4–1	Jim Gardner	TKO	3 (6)	Mar 31, 1908	Brown's Gym, New York City, New York, U.S.	
4	Win	3–1	Red Shaw	TKO	3 (6)	Mar 17, 1908	Brown's Gym, New York City, New York, U.S.	
3	Win	2–1	Harry Lortz	NWS	6	Mar 14, 1908	National A.C., New York City, New York, U.S.	
2	Win	1–1	Harry Phillips	TKO	2 (4)	Mar 12, 1908	Long Acre A.C., New York City, New York, U.S.	
1	Loss	0–1	Babe Cullen	NWS	4	Mar 2, 1908	Dry Dock A.C., New York City, New York, U.S.	

== See also ==
- Lineal championship
- List of welterweight boxing champions

== Achievements ==
Achievements
Preceded by Matt Wells	World Welterweight Champion; June 1, 1915 – June 22, 1915	Succeeded by Jack Britton
