= Ted "Kid" Lewis =

English boxer (1894–1970)

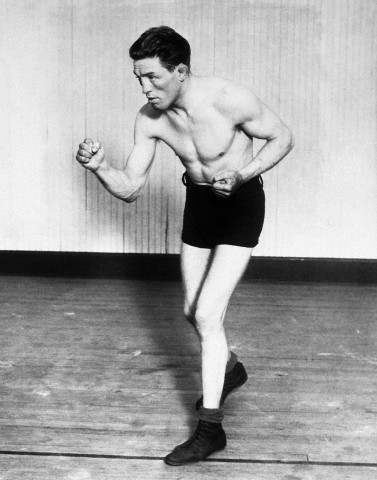

Personal information
- Nickname: The Aldgate Sphinx
- Born: Gershon Mendeloff; 28 October 1894? Parish of St George in the East, London, England
- Died: 20 October 1970 (aged 75) London, England
- Height: 5 ft 7.5 in (1.71 m)
- Weight: Light Heavyweight; Middleweight; Welterweight

Boxing career
- Reach: 69 in (175 cm)

Boxing record
- Total fights: 301
- Wins: 232
- Win by KO: 77
- Losses: 46
- Draws: 23

Ted "Kid" Lewis (born Gershon Mendeloff; 28 October 1894? – 20 October 1970) was an English professional boxer who twice won the World Welterweight Championship (147 lb). Lewis is often ranked among the all-time greats, fighting an historic rivalry with Hall of Fame legend Jack Britton, in which he won seven, lost ten, and drew twice. ESPN ranked him 41st on their list of the 50 Greatest Boxers of All-Time and boxing historian Bert Sugar placing him 46th in his Top 100 Fighters catalogue. Statistical boxing website BoxRec ranks Lewis as the 17th best welterweight of all-time and the 7th best UK boxer ever. He is a member of the International Jewish Sports Hall of Fame, the Ring Magazine Hall of Fame, and the International Boxing Hall of Fame.

== Boxing career ==
=== Career beginnings ===
Lewis was born as Gershon Mendeloff in a gas-lit tenement in the now demolished Umberston Street, in the Aldgate Pump section of London's East End. His father was a cabinet-maker. One of his elder brothers had become a boxer under the name of Lou Lewis. At the suggestion of a police officer – who had witnessed his performance in a street brawl – he entered the boxing ring in 1909, making his fighting debut as 'Kid' Lewis, having joined as a member of the Judaean Club, Whitechapel (the name "Ted" was added later, in America). He subsequently won the club's Flyweight title and took home a cup of imitation silver.

He became a professional boxer in 1909. On 6 October 1913, Lewis won the British Featherweight Championship with a 17th-round knockout of Alec Lambert at London's National Sporting Club. A year later, on 2 February 1914, at London's Premierland (in Whitechapel), he won the European Featherweight title from the French boxer Paul Til via a 12th round foul. Still in 1914, campaigning as a lightweight and welterweight, Lewis left London and toured Australia. In 1915 Lewis travelled to the United States, fighting Phil Bloom in New York's Madison Square Garden and winning by a decision.

=== Taking the world welterweight title; rivalry with Jack Britton ===
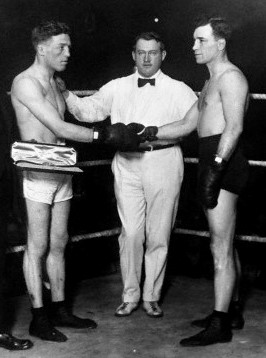
Lewis (left), shaking hands with arch-rival Jack Britton

In Boston's Armory, on 31 August of that same year, he fought the man known as the "Boxing Marvel," Jack Britton, for the Welterweight title. Lewis won in a twelve-round decision, becoming World Welterweight Champion and beginning an historic rivalry. Lewis became the first English boxer to cross the Atlantic and beat an American for a world title. This victory made him one of the youngest world champions in history at the age of 21 or 22 depending on the source.

The fights between Lewis and Britton for the world title were particularly notable. Their relationship has been described as one of the greatest rivalries in boxing history, and it was said that 'they winced and ducked every time they heard the other man's name'. From 1915 to 1921 Lewis and Britton fought 20 times, a total of 224 rounds.

On 24 April 1916, in New Orleans, Lewis lost the title to Britton. He reclaimed it on 25 June 1917, at Westwood Field, Dayton, Ohio. He lost the title for the last time on 17 March 1919, in Canton, Ohio, when Britton knocked him out in the 9th round – the only knockout of the series. The roundup of his matches with Britton: Lewis won 3, lost 4, and had 1 draw. There were 12 no decisions. After his last loss to Britton, Lewis returned to England.

=== Taking the British and European welterweight titles ===
On 9 June 1920, at London's Olympia Exhibition Centre, he beat Johnny Basham to win the British and European Welterweight titles. He relinquished these in December of that year due to difficulty in making the weight. His drive to fight Georges Carpentier, World and European Light Heavyweight Champion, came to fruition on 11 May 1922, at Olympia. Lewis, fighting at 150 pounds to Carpentier's 175, spent most of the first round giving the heavier man a drubbing. Then referee Joe Palmer put a hand on Lewis's shoulder to warn him against holding. Carpentier took advantage of this distraction and sneaked in a vicious right. The Kid went crashing to the canvas and was counted out. The Olympia crowd erupted furiously, crying, "foul," but to no avail. The Kid remained nonplussed. "I felt cheated, but I didn’t bear any grudge," he would later say.

=== Taking the British and European middleweight titles ===
On 6 June 1922, at Holland Park Rink, London, Lewis knocked out Frankie Burns to win the British Middleweight title. On 11 November the same year, also at Holland Park Rink, he beat Roland Todd to win the European Middleweight title. He did not hold either title long, losing both at the Royal Albert Hall on 15 February 1923 after a gruelling rematch with Todd.

Lewis won his last two titles, the British and European Welterweight crowns, on 3 July 1924 – again at London's Royal Albert Hall – by defeating Johnny Brown. Two years later, on 26 November 1924, at Waverley Market Hall in Edinburgh, he lost these championships to the much younger Scotsman, Tommy Milligan. He continued boxing until 1929, adding 20 more fights.

His final record counting newspaper decisions was: 299 bouts, 233 won, 41 lost, 25 draws, 65 no decisions, 80 knockouts. Lewis started his career as an evasive, defensive boxer with a long left. During the six years he spent in America he changed his style radically, becoming a very aggressive, swarming, combination boxer-fighter.

== Life after boxing ==
In 1929 Lewis fought the last of nearly 300 career bouts in Hoxton, London, winning by a knockout. Over the course of his career, he had lost only 41 times. He then announced his retirement from boxing and settled back in his native east London.

His success in America had also made Lewis very famous at home in the UK and he had become an international celebrity. He met his future wife Elsie Schneider in New York, and became a close friend of Charlie Chaplin, who would act as godfather to Lewis' son Morton. Lewis tried his hand in the movies, predominantly tackling boxing pictures. Inevitably, he was typecast: not only was Lewis best known as a fighter, he also looked like one, with many years of punishment having left their mark on his face.

Much to the dismay of friends and family, he later acted as a bodyguard for Oswald Mosley's New Party and was also persuaded to stand in the 1931 general election as a candidate for the party in his local Whitechapel and St Georges constituency; he polled only 154 votes. However, Lewis fell out with Mosley when his subsequent political movement, the British Union of Fascists revealed itself as openly anti-Semitic. After the defeat of 1931, Mosley embraced European-style fascism and founded the British Union of Fascists in 1932. Among other things, this saw him move towards more open anti-Semitism, particularly in Lewis' native East London. In his biography of his father, Morton Lewis describes how he was taken along by his father when he went to quit Mosley's movement. It involves Lewis violently arguing with Mosley and a pair of his henchmen at their headquarters, leaving the former reeling on the ground and the other two out cold. Then, after leaving, Lewis is described as returning to the building on a whim and knocking out two more of Mosley's guards without provocation.

Restless in his career choices, he worked as a boxing trainer and manager, a gambling bookmaker, a haberdasher, a purveyor of wines and spirits, a boxing referee, a security officer, a travel agent and he also made numerous personal appearances, trading on his celebrity. He stayed married to his wife Elsie for forty-five years until her death.

During the early 1960s, Lewis was befriended by the notorious Kray twins; the boxing-infatuated gangland bosses enjoyed bringing the famous old champion to their parties and charity evenings, and they even used him as a decoy when arranging the escape of a fellow criminal from Dartmoor prison.

In his final years, after his wife died, he was afflicted with failing eyesight and Parkinson's disease. From 1966 he lived comfortably in a south London retirement home for the Jewish elderly, Nightingale House in Clapham. He died there in October 1970. In 2003, an English Heritage blue plaque was erected at Nightingale House in his honour, which was unveiled by his son, Morton.

== Professional boxing record ==
All information in this section is derived from BoxRec, unless otherwise stated.

=== Official record ===
301 fights	191 wins	32 losses
By knockout	77	6
By decision	111	20
By disqualification	3	6
Draws	14	
Newspaper decisions/draws	64	

All newspaper decisions are officially regarded as “no decision” bouts and are not counted in the win/loss/draw column.

No.	Result	Record	Opponent	Type	Round(s)	Date	Location	Notes
301	Win	191–32–14 (64)	Johnny Basham	TKO	3 (10)	13 Dec 1929	Pitfield Street Baths, Hoxton, London, England, UK	
300	Loss	190–32–14 (64)	Charley Belanger	DQ	1 (15)	17 Dec 1928	Coliseum, Toronto, Ontario, Canada	For Commonwealth light heavyweight title
299	Loss	190–31–14 (64)	Maxie Rosenbloom	DQ	6 (15)	31 Jul 1928	Queensboro Stadium, Long Island City, New York City, New York, U.S.	
298	Draw	190–30–14 (64)	Johnny Squires	KO	1 (10)	7 Jan 1928	Town Hall, Johannesburg, Gauteng, Union of South Africa	
297	Win	190–30–13 (64)	Alec Storbeck	KO	1 (10)	3 Dec 1927	Town Hall, Johannesburg, Gauteng, Union of South Africa	
296	Win	189–30–13 (64)	Joe Rolfe	RTD	11 (15)	15 Nov 1927	Premierland, Whitechapel, London, England, UK	
295	Win	188–30–13 (64)	Robert Amssens	TKO	1 (15)	2 Oct 1927	Premierland, Whitechapel, London, England, UK	
294	Win	187–30–13 (64)	Ted Coveney	TKO	6 (15)	11 Sep 1927	Premierland, Whitechapel, London, England, UK	
293	Win	186–30–13 (64)	Nol Steenhorst	RTD	9 (15)	28 Aug 1927	Premierland, Whitechapel, London, England, UK	
292	Win	185–30–13 (64)	Jim Carr	KO	3 (15)	14 Aug 1927	Premierland, Whitechapel, London, England, UK	
291	Win	184–30–13 (64)	Joe Green	RTD	4 (15)	4 Aug 1927	Skating Rink, Ilford, London, England, UK	
290	Win	183–30–13 (64)	Billy Mattick	DQ	5 (20)	21 Mar 1926	Premierland, Whitechapel, London, England, UK	
289	Win	182–30–13 (64)	Billy Pritchard	TKO	10 (15)	7 Mar 1926	Premierland, Whitechapel, London, England, UK	
288	Loss	181–30–13 (64)	Len Johnson	RTD	10 (20)	27 Nov 1925	King's Hall, Belle Vue, Manchester, Lancashire, England, UK	
287	Loss	181–29–13 (64)	Simon Rosman	DQ	8 (15)	8 Nov 1925	Premierland, Whitechapel, London, England, UK	
286	Loss	181–28–13 (64)	Marcel Thuru	DQ	1 (15)	8 Oct 1925	Royal Albert Hall, Kensington, London, England, UK	
285	Win	181–27–13 (64)	Bob Sage	PTS	10	10 Jul 1925	Legion Stadium, Hollywood, California, U.S.	
284	Loss	180–27–13 (64)	Tommy Milligan	DQ	5 (20)	19 Mar 1925	Royal Albert Hall, Kensington, London, England, UK	
283	Win	180–26–13 (64)	Francis Charles	PTS	20	22 Jan 1925	Royal Albert Hall, Kensington, London, England, UK	
282	Loss	179–26–13 (64)	Tommy Milligan	PTS	20	26 Nov 1924	Industrial Hall, Edinburgh, Scotland, UK	Lost EBU, BBBofC British, and Commonwealth welterweight titles
281	Win	179–25–13 (64)	Johnny Brown	PTS	20	3 Jul 1924	Royal Albert Hall, Kensington, London, England, UK	Won EBU, BBBofC British, and Commonwealth welterweight titles
280	Draw	178–25–13 (64)	Piet Hobin	PTS	20	1 Jun 1924	Stade Buffalo, Montrouge, Hauts-de-Seine, France	
279	Win	178–25–12 (64)	Erich Milenz	KO	8 (10)	12 Apr 1924	Sportpalast, Schoeneberg, Berlin, Weimar Republic	
278	Draw	177–25–12 (64)	Chic Nelson	PTS	15	6 Apr 1924	Zirkus Busch, Hamburg, Weimar Republic	
277	Win	177–25–11 (64)	Francois Charles	PTS	15	18 Mar 1924	Cirque de Paris, Paris, Paris, France	
276	Win	176–25–11 (64)	Bruno Frattini	KO	17 (20)	12 Feb 1924	Palazzo dello Sport (Pad. 3 Fiera), Milan, Lombardia, Kingdom of Italy	
275	Win	175–25–11 (64)	Sergeant Sid Pape	RTD	2 (20)	28 Jan 1924	Windsor Hall, Bradford, Yorkshire, U.S.	
274	Win	174–25–11 (64)	Fred Davies	PTS	20	26 Dec 1923	Premierland, Whitechapel, London, England, UK	
273	Win	173–25–11 (64)	Fred Archer	PTS	20	8 Nov 1923	Premierland, Whitechapel, London, England, UK	
272	Win	172–25–11 (64)	Frank Burns	PTS	20	4 Oct 1923	Premierland, Whitechapel, London, England, UK	
271	Loss	171–25–11 (64)	Augie Ratner	PTS	20	30 Jul 1923	Royal Albert Hall, Kensington, London, England, UK	
270	Loss	171–24–11 (64)	Roland Todd	PTS	20	15 Feb 1923	Royal Albert Hall, Kensington, London, England, UK	Lost EBU, BBBofC British, and Commonwealth middleweight titles
269	Win	171–23–11 (64)	Roland Todd	PTS	20	20 Nov 1922	Holland Park Rink, Kensington, London, England, UK	Won EBU, BBBofC British, and Commonwealth middleweight titles
268	Win	170–23–11 (64)	Marcel Thomas	TKO	4 (15)	4 Sep 1922	Premierland, Whitechapel, London, England, UK	
267	Win	169–23–11 (64)	Frank Burns	KO	11 (20)	19 Jun 1922	Holland Park Rink, Kensington, London, England, UK	
266	Loss	168–23–11 (64)	Georges Carpentier	KO	1 (20)	5 May 1922	The Dome, Brighton, Sussex, England, UK	For EBU and world light heavyweight titles
265	Win	168–22–11 (64)	Tom Gummer	KO	1 (20)	17 Feb 1922	The Dome, Brighton, Sussex, England, UK	
264	Win	167–22–11 (64)	Boy McCormick	TKO	14 (20)	17 Nov 1921	Royal Albert Hall, Kensington, London, England, UK	Won BBBofC british light heavyweight title
263	Win	166–22–11 (64)	Johnny Basham	RTD	12 (20)	14 Oct 1921	Royal Albert Hall, Kensington, London, England, UK	Retained EBU and BBBofC British welterweight titles
262	Win	165–22–11 (64)	Ernie Barrieau	KO	10 (10)	20 Sep 1921	Arena, Toronto, Ontario, Canada	
261	Win	164–22–11 (64)	Jack Bloomfield	PTS	20	27 Jun 1921	Holland Park Rink, Kensington, London, England, UK	Won vacant BBBofC middleweight title
260	Loss	163–22–11 (64)	Augie Ratner	PTS	15	13 Apr 1921	Manhattan Casino, New York City, New York, U.S.	
259	Loss	163–21–11 (64)	Nate Siegel	PTS	10	8 Apr 1921	Arena, Boston, Massachusetts, U.S.	
258	Win	163–20–11 (64)	Jack Perry	NWS	10	14 Mar 1921	Roller Palace Rink, Detroit, Michigan, U.S.	
257	Loss	163–20–11 (63)	Jack Britton	UD	15	7 Feb 1921	Madison Square Garden, New York City, New York, U.S.	For world welterweight title
256	Win	163–19–11 (63)	Johnny Basham	KO	19 (20)	19 Nov 1920	Royal Albert Hall, Kensington, London, England, UK	Retained EBU, BBBofC British, and Commonwealth welterweight titles
255	Win	162–19–11 (63)	Marcel Thomas	NWS	8	12 Oct 1920	Westside Ballpark, Jersey City, New Jersey, U.S.	
254	Loss	162–19–11 (62)	Mike O'Dowd	NWS	12	23 Sep 1920	Westside Ballpark, Jersey City, New Jersey, U.S.	
253	Win	162–19–11 (61)	Johnny Basham	RTD	9 (20)	9 Jun 1920	Olympia, Kensington, London, England, UK	Won EBU, BBBofC British, and Commonwealth welterweight titles
252	Win	161–19–11 (61)	Kid Doyle	RTD	5 (20)	30 Apr 1920	Holborn Stadium, Holborn, London, England, UK	
251	Win	160–19–11 (61)	Kid Doyle	RTD	11 (20)	5 Apr 1920	Liverpool Stadium, Pudsey Street, Liverpool, Merseyside, England, UK	
250	Win	159–19–11 (61)	Johnny Bee	KO	4 (20)	11 Mar 1920	Holborn Stadium, Holborn, London, England, UK	Won vacant BBBofC British middleweight title
249	Win	158–19–11 (61)	Gus Platts	RTD	18 (20)	4 Mar 1920	Edmund Rd Drill Hall, Sheffield, Yorkshire, England, UK	
248	Win	157–19–11 (61)	Jerry Shea	KO	1 (20)	28 Feb 1920	Pavilion, Mountain Ash, Wales, UK	
247	Win	156–19–11 (61)	Maurice Prunier	KO	6 (20)	14 Feb 1920	Cirque de Paris, Paris, Paris, France	
246	Win	155–19–11 (61)	Frank Moody	KO	1 (15)	13 Jan 1920	Free Trade Hall, Manchester, Lancashire, England, UK	
245	Win	154–19–11 (61)	Matt Wells	RTD	12 (20)	26 Dec 1919	Royal Albert Hall, Kensington, London, England, UK	
244	Win	153–19–11 (61)	Jake Abel	PTS	10	28 Oct 1919	Armory Auditorium, Atlanta, Georgia, U.S.	
243	Win	152–19–11 (61)	Jimmy McCabe	KO	1 (10)	16 Oct 1919	Atlantic City S.C., Atlantic City, New Jersey, U.S.	
242	Win	151–19–11 (61)	K.O. Willie Loughlin	KO	1 (10)	11 Oct 1919	Arena, Boston, Massachusetts, U.S.	
241	Loss	150–19–11 (61)	Mike O'Dowd	NWS	8	1 Sep 1919	Arena, Syracuse, New York, U.S.	world middleweight title at stake; (via KO only)
240	Draw	150–19–11 (60)	Steve Latzo	NWS	8	4 Aug 1919	Shibe Park, Philadelphia, Pennsylvania, U.S.	
239	Loss	150–19–11 (59)	Jack Britton	NWS	8	28 Jul 1919	Armory A.A., Jersey City, New Jersey, U.S.	World welterweight title at stake; (via KO only)
238	Win	150–19–11 (58)	Steve Latzo	NWS	6	14 Jul 1919	Shibe Park, Philadelphia, Pennsylvania, U.S.	
237	Loss	150–19–11 (57)	Jack Britton	KO	9 (12)	17 Mar 1919	Arena, Boston, Massachusetts, U.S.	Lost world welterweight title
236	Draw	150–18–11 (57)	Johnny Griffiths	NWS	8	10 Mar 1919	Lyric Theater, Memphis, Tennessee, U.S.	World welterweight title at stake; (via KO only)
235	Win	150–18–11 (56)	Georges Rivet	NWS	10	13 Jan 1919	Sohmer Park, Montreal, Quebec, Canada	
234	Draw	150–18–11 (55)	Bryan Downey	NWS	15	1 Jan 1919	Memorial Hall, Columbus, Ohio, U.S.	
233	Draw	150–18–11 (54)	Benny Leonard	NWS	8	23 Sep 1918	Weidenmeyer's Park, Newark, New Jersey, U.S.	World welterweight title at stake; (via KO only)
232	Win	150–18–11 (53)	Walter Mohr	NWS	8	17 Aug 1918	Westside Ballpark, Jersey City, New Jersey, U.S.	
231	Win	150–18–11 (52)	Tommy Robson	PTS	12	13 Aug 1918	Arena, Boston, Massachusetts, U.S.	
230	Win	149–18–11 (52)	Johnny Griffiths	NWS	20	4 Jul 1918	East Market Street Gardens, Akron, Ohio, U.S.	World welterweight title at stake; (via KO only)
229	Win	149–18–11 (51)	Tommy Robson	PTS	12	25 Jun 1918	Arena, Boston, Massachusetts, U.S.	
228	Loss	148–18–11 (51)	Jack Britton	NWS	6	20 Jun 1918	Madison Square Garden, New York City, New York, U.S.	
227	Win	148–18–11 (50)	Johnny Tillman	UD	20	17 May 1918	Stockyards Stadium, Denver, Colorado, U.S.	Retained world welterweight title
226	Draw	147–18–11 (50)	Jack Britton	NWS	10	2 Mar 1918	Town Hall, Scranton, Pennsylvania, U.S.	World welterweight title at stake; (via KO only)
225	Loss	147–18–11 (49)	Joe Eagan	NWS	10	16 Apr 1918	Southside A.C., Milwaukee, Wisconsin, U.S.	
224	Loss	147–18–11 (48)	Jack Britton	NWS	10	6 Mar 1918	Armory Auditorium, Atlanta, Georgia, U.S.	World welterweight title at stake; (via KO only)
223	Win	147–18–11 (47)	Willie Langford	NWS	10	26 Feb 1918	Broadway Auditorium, Buffalo, New York, U.S.	
222	Draw	147–18–11 (46)	Jakob "Soldier" Bartfield	NWS	6	25 Feb 1918	Olympia A.C., Philadelphia, Pennsylvania, U.S.	
221	Win	147–18–11 (45)	Lockport Jimmy Duffy	TKO	1 (15)	18 Feb 1918	Dreamland Rink, San Francisco, California, U.S.	
220	Win	146–18–11 (45)	Johnny Tillman	NWS	12	4 Feb 1918	Olympia A.C., Philadelphia, Pennsylvania, U.S.	
219	Win	146–18–11 (44)	Jakob "Soldier" Bartfield	NWS	12	23 Jan 1918	Massey Hall, Toronto, Ontario, Canada	
218	Draw	146–18–11 (43)	Jakob "Soldier" Bartfield	NWS	12	14 Jan 1918	Memorial Hall, Columbus, Ohio, U.S.	
217	Win	146–18–11 (42)	Bryan Downey	NWS	12	17 Dec 1917	Memorial Hall, Columbus, Ohio, U.S.	World welterweight title at stake; (via KO only)
216	Win	146–18–11 (41)	Johnny McCarthy	PTS	4	13 Nov 1917	Dreamland Rink, San Francisco, California, U.S.	
215	Draw	145–18–11 (41)	Battling Ortega	PTS	4	24 Oct 1917	Arena, Emeryville, California, U.S.	
214	Win	145–18–10 (41)	Frank Carbone	NWS	10	22 Sep 1917	Broadway S.C., New York City, New York, U.S.	
213	Win	145–18–10 (40)	Italian Joe Gans	NWS	10	15 Sep 1917	Broadway S.C., New York City, New York, U.S.	
212	Win	145–18–10 (39)	Jimmy O'Hagan	NWS	10	14 Sep 1917	St. Nicholas Arena, New York City, New York, U.S.	
211	Win	145–18–10 (38)	Jakob "Soldier" Bartfield	NWS	10	11 Sep 1917	Airdome A.C., Rochester, New York, U.S.	
210	Loss	145–18–10 (37)	Jakob "Soldier" Bartfield	NWS	10	3 Sep 1917	Broadway Auditorium, Buffalo, New York, U.S.	
209	Win	145–18–10 (36)	Albert Badoud	KO	1 (12)	31 Aug 1917	St. Nicholas Arena, New York City, New York, U.S.	
208	Loss	144–18–10 (36)	Mike O'Dowd	PTS	12	28 Aug 1917	Arena, Boston, Massachusetts, U.S.	
207	Win	144–17–10 (36)	Mike O'Dowd	NWS	10	17 Aug 1917	St. Nicholas Arena, New York City, New York, U.S.	
206	Win	144–17–10 (35)	Jimmy O'Hagan	NWS	10	7 Aug 1917	Convention Hall, Saratoga, New York, U.S.	
205	Loss	144–17–10 (34)	Johnny Griffiths	NWS	15	4 Jul 1917	Grossvater Park, Akron, Ohio, U.S.	
204	Win	144–17–10 (33)	Jack Britton	PTS	20	25 Jun 1917	Westwood Field, Dayton, Ohio, U.S.	Won world welterweight title
203	Win	143–17–10 (33)	Jack Britton	NWS	10	14 Jun 1917	St. Nicholas Arena, New York City, New York, U.S.	World welterweight title at stake; (via KO only)
202	Win	143–17–10 (32)	Jack Britton	NWS	10	6 Jun 1917	Coliseum, Saint Louis, Missouri, U.S.	World welterweight title at stake; (via KO only)
201	Win	143–17–10 (31)	Mike O'Dowd	NWS	10	24 May 1917	St. Nicholas Arena, New York City, New York, U.S.	
200	Win	143–17–10 (30)	Joe Eagan	PTS	12	22 May 1917	Arena (Armory A.A.), Boston, Massachusetts, U.S.	
199	Win	142–17–10 (30)	Jack Britton	NWS	10	19 May 1917	Massey Hall, Toronto, Ontario, Canada	World welterweight title at stake; (via KO only)
198	Win	142–17–10 (29)	Jimmy O'Hagen	KO	2 (10)	4 May 1917	Harlem S.C., New York City, New York, U.S.	
197	Win	141–17–10 (29)	Johnny Griffiths	NWS	12	30 Apr 1917	Coliseum, Columbus, Ohio, U.S.	
196	Win	141–17–10 (28)	Billy Weeks	KO	12 (12)	12 Apr 1917	Gymnastic Club, Dayton, Ohio, U.S.	
195	Win	140–17–10 (28)	Jimmy Coffey	KO	1 (12)	4 Apr 1917	Hunts Point Palace, New York City, New York, U.S.	
194	Win	139–17–10 (28)	Jack Britton	NWS	10	26 Mar 1917	Heuck's Opera House, Cincinnati, Ohio, U.S.	World welterweight title at stake; (via KO only)
193	Win	139–17–10 (27)	Willie Moore	KO	1 (10)	19 Mar 1917	Hunts Point Palace, New York City, New York, U.S.	
192	Win	138–17–10 (27)	Johnny Griffiths	NWS	12	26 Feb 1917	East Market Street Gardens, Akron, Ohio, U.S.	
191	Win	138–17–10 (26)	Kid Graves	KO	9 (10)	6 Feb 1917	Broadway S.C., New York City, New York, U.S.	
190	Win	137–17–10 (26)	Sam Robideau	PTS	15	31 Jan 1917	Marieville Gardens, North Providence, Rhode Island, U.S.	
189	Win	136–17–10 (26)	Johnny Griffiths	NWS	10	29 Jan 1917	Hunts Point Palace, New York City, New York, U.S.	
188	Draw	136–17–10 (25)	Johnny Griffiths	NWS	10	21 Dec 1916	Gray's Armory, Cleveland, Ohio, U.S.	
187	Win	136–17–10 (24)	Johnny Griffiths	NWS	10	23 Nov 1916	Gray's Armory, Cleveland, Ohio, U.S.	
186	Draw	136–17–10 (23)	Jack Britton	PTS	12	14 Nov 1916	Arena, Boston, Massachusetts, U.S.	For world welterweight title
185	Win	136–17–9 (23)	Young Denny	NWS	12	24 Oct 1916	Coliseum, Saint Louis, Missouri, U.S.	
184	Loss	136–17–9 (22)	Jack Britton	PTS	12	17 Oct 1916	Arena, Boston, Massachusetts, U.S.	For world welterweight title
183	Win	136–16–9 (22)	Mike Glover	PTS	12	13 Jun 1916	Arena (Armory A.A.), Boston, Massachusetts, U.S.	
182	Win	135–16–9 (22)	Eddie Moha	KO	12 (15)	24 May 1916	Gymnastic Club, Dayton, Ohio, U.S.	
181	Loss	134–16–9 (22)	Mike Gibbons	NWS	10	16 May 1916	Madison Square Garden, New York City, New York, U.S.	World middleweight title claim at stake; (via KO only)
180	Loss	134–16–9 (21)	Jack Britton	PTS	20	24 Apr 1916	Louisiana Auditorium, New Orleans, Louisiana, U.S.	Lost world welterweight title
179	Win	134–15–9 (21)	Jack Abel	PTS	8	19 Apr 1916	Tommy Burns Arena, New Orleans, Louisiana, U.S.	
178	Win	133–15–9 (21)	Harry Stone	PTS	20	1 Mar 1916	Tommy Burns Arena, New Orleans, Louisiana, U.S.	Retained world welterweight title
177	Win	132–15–9 (21)	Harry Trendall	KO	7 (8)	24 Feb 1916	Coliseum, Saint Louis, Missouri, U.S.	
176	Loss	131–15–9 (21)	Lockport Jimmy Duffy	NWS	10	21 Feb 1916	Broadway Auditorium, Buffalo, New York, U.S.	World welterweight title at stake; (via KO only)
175	Loss	131–15–9 (20)	Jack Britton	NWS	10	15 Feb 1916	Broadway Auditorium, New York City, New York, U.S.	World welterweight title at stake; (via KO only)
174	Loss	131–15–9 (19)	Jakob "Soldier" Bartfield	NWS	10	9 Feb 1916	Broadway Auditorium, Buffalo, New York, U.S.	
173	Win	131–15–9 (18)	Marty Farrell	NWS	6	5 Feb 1916	National A.C., Philadelphia, Pennsylvania, U.S.	
172	Loss	131–15–9 (17)	Jack Britton	NWS	10	20 Jan 1916	Broadway Auditorium, Buffalo, New York, U.S.	World welterweight title at stake; (via KO only)
171	Win	131–15–9 (16)	Kid Graves	NWS	10	17 Jan 1916	Auditorium, Milwaukee, Wisconsin, U.S.	World welterweight title at stake; (via KO only)
170	Draw	131–15–9 (15)	Willie KO Brennan	NWS	10	1 Jan 1916	Broadway Auditorium, Buffalo, New York, U.S.	
169	Win	131–15–9 (14)	Willie Ritchie	NWS	10	28 Dec 1915	Madison Square Garden, New York City, New York, U.S.	World welterweight title at stake; (via KO only)
168	Win	131–15–9 (13)	Young Neil	PTS	15	3 Dec 1915	Gymnastic Club, Dayton, Ohio, U.S.	
167	Loss	130–15–9 (13)	Mike Glover	PTS	12	30 Nov 1915	Arena (Atlas A.A.), Boston, Massachusetts, U.S.	
166	Win	130–14–9 (13)	Lockport Jimmy Duffy	KO	1 (12)	23 Nov 1915	Arena, Boston, Massachusetts, U.S.	Retained world welterweight title
165	Win	129–14–9 (13)	Milburn Saylor	PTS	12	2 Nov 1915	Arena (Atlas A.A.), Boston, Massachusetts, U.S.	
164	Win	128–14–9 (13)	Joe Mandot	PTS	12	26 Oct 1915	Arena, Boston, Massachusetts, U.S.	Retained world welterweight title
163	Win	127–14–9 (13)	Willie Moore	NWS	6	18 Oct 1915	Olympia A.C., Philadelphia, Pennsylvania, U.S.	
162	Win	127–14–9 (12)	Jack Britton	PTS	12	28 Sep 1915	Arena (Atlas A.A.), Boston, Massachusetts, U.S.	Retained world welterweight title
161	Win	126–14–9 (12)	Jack Britton	PTS	12	31 Aug 1915	Arena, Boston, Massachusetts, U.S.	Won world welterweight title
160	Win	125–14–9 (12)	Fighting Zunner	NWS	10	17 Aug 1915	Bison Stadium, Buffalo, New York, U.S.	
159	Win	125–14–9 (11)	Kid Curley	NWS	10	11 Aug 1915	Bison Stadium, Buffalo, New York, U.S.	
158	Win	125–14–9 (10)	Mike Glover	PTS	12	3 Aug 1915	Arena (Atlas A.A.), Boston, Massachusetts, U.S.	
157	Win	124–14–9 (10)	Charley White	NWS	10	21 Jul 1915	St. Nicholas Arena, New York City, New York, U.S.	
156	Win	124–14–9 (9)	Mike Mazie	NWS	10	25 Jun 1915	Brown's Gym A.A., Far Rockaway, New York City, New York, U.S.	
155	Win	124–14–9 (8)	Johnny Marto	NWS	10	23 Jun 1915	St. Nicholas Arena, New York City, New York, U.S.	
154	Win	124–14–9 (7)	Kid Graves	NWS	10	9 Jun 1915	St. Nicholas Arena, New York City, New York, U.S.	
153	Win	124–14–9 (6)	Johnny Lustig	PTS	10	30 Mar 1915	Sohmer Park, Montreal, Quebec, Canada	
152	Win	123–14–9 (6)	Johnny Lore	NWS	10	16 Apr 1915	Canadian A.C., Montreal, Quebec, Canada	
151	Win	123–14–9 (5)	Harry Lenny	NWS	10	6 Apr 1915	Federal A.C., New York City, New York, U.S.	
150	Loss	123–14–9 (4)	Jack Britton	NWS	10	26 Mar 1915	135th Street A.C., New York City, New York, U.S.	
149	Win	123–14–9 (3)	Frankie Mack	PTS	20	10 Mar 1915	Estadio Tropical, Havana, Cuba	
148	Win	122–14–9 (3)	Willie Moore	NWS	6	1 Jan 1915	National A.C., Philadelphia, Pennsylvania, U.S.	
147	Win	122–14–9 (2)	Young Jack O'Brien	NWS	6	25 Dec 1914	National A.C., Philadelphia, Pennsylvania, U.S.	
146	Win	122–14–9 (1)	Phil Bloom	NWS	10	9 Nov 1914	Madison Square Garden, New York City, New York, U.S.	
145	Win	122–14–9	Bobby Moore	PTS	20	1 Aug 1914	Baker's Pavilion, Melbourne, Victoria, Australia	
144	Loss	121–14–9	Herb McCoy	PTS	20	11 Jul 1914	Baker's Pavilion, Melbourne, Victoria, Australia	
143	Win	121–13–9	Joe Shugrue	PTS	20	27 Jun 1914	Sydney Stadium, Sydney, New South Wales, UK, Australia	
142	Win	120–13–9	Hughie Mehegan	PTS	20	13 Jun 1914	Sydney Stadium, Sydney, New South Wales, UK, Australia	
141	Win	119–13–9	Herb McCoy	PTS	20	30 May 1914	Sydney Stadium, Sydney, New South Wales, UK, Australia	
140	Win	118–13–9	Ted Saunders	KO	6 (10)	18 Mar 1914	Drill Hall, Coventry, West Midlands, England, UK	
139	Win	117–13–9	Harry Kid Berry	KO	3 (15)	14 Mar 1914	Premierland, Whitechapel, London, England, UK	
138	Win	116–13–9	Paul Til	DQ	12 (20)	2 Feb 1914	Premierland, Whitechapel, London, England, UK	Retained EBU featherweight title
137	Win	115–13–9	George Buswell	TKO	2 (20)	5 Jan 1914	The Ring, Blackfriars Road, Southwark, London, England, UK	
136	Win	114–13–9	Alec Lambert	TKO	17 (20)	6 Oct 1913	National Sporting Club, Covent Garden, London, England, UK	Won vacant EBU and National Sporting Club featherweight titles
135	Win	113–13–9	Fernand Quendreux	KO	10 (15)	15 Sep 1913	The Ring, Blackfriars Road, Southwark, London, England, UK	
134	Win	112–13–9	Harry Sterling	PTS	15	23 Aug 1913	The Ring, Blackfriars Road, Southwark, London, England, UK	
133	Win	111–13–9	Duke Lynch	PTS	15	26 Jul 1913	The Ring, Blackfriars Road, Southwark, London, England, UK	
132	Win	110–13–9	Harry Sterling	RTD	7 (15)	19 Jul 1913	The Ring, Blackfriars Road, Southwark, London, England, UK	
131	Win	109–13–9	Joe Starmer	PTS	15	2 Jun 1913	National Sporting Club, Covent Garden, London, England, UK	
130	Win	108–13–9	Young Joe Brooks	PTS	15	7 Apr 1913	National Sporting Club, Covent Garden, London, England, UK	
129	Win	107–13–9	Johnny Condon	PTS	20	3 Mar 1913	The Ring, Blackfriars Road, Southwark, London, England, UK	
128	Win	106–13–9	Johnny Condon	PTS	20	27 Jan 1913	The Ring, Blackfriars Road, Southwark, London, England, UK	
127	Draw	105–13–9	Nat Williams	PTS	15	16 Jan 1913	Liverpool Stadium, Pudsey Street, Liverpool, Merseyside, England, UK	
126	Win	105–13–8	George Buswell	TKO	14 (15)	4 Jan 1913	The Ring, Blackfriars Road, Southwark, London, England, UK	
125	Win	104–13–8	Jim Lloyd	PTS	10	2 Jan 1913	Liverpool Stadium, Pudsey Street, Liverpool, Merseyside, England, UK	
124	Win	103–13–8	Harry Kid Berry	PTS	15	21 Dec 1912	Premierland, Whitechapel, London, England, UK	
123	Win	102–13–8	Jim Shires	PTS	10	16 Dec 1912	The Ring, Blackfriars Road, Southwark, London, England, UK	
122	Win	101–13–8	Private Jack Harrison	KO	3 (6)	2 Dec 1912	National Sporting Club, Covent Garden, London, England, UK	
121	Win	100–13–8	George Ruddick	PTS	12	30 Nov 1912	Premierland, Whitechapel, London, England, UK	
120	Win	99–13–8	Alf Small	KO	5 (10)	16 Nov 1912	Premierland, Whitechapel, London, England, UK	
119	Win	98–13–8	Fred Young Halsband	PTS	10	9 Nov 1912	National Sporting Club, Covent Garden, London, England, UK	
118	Win	97–13–8	Jim Campbell	PTS	6	21 Oct 1912	Premierland, Whitechapel, London, England, UK	
117	Win	96–13–8	Young Jack Chinney	KO	3 (10)	19 Oct 1912	Premierland, Whitechapel, London, England, UK	
116	Win	95–13–8	Jim Lloyd	PTS	10	12 Oct 1912	Premierland, Whitechapel, London, England, UK	
115	Loss	94–13–8	Con Houghton	DQ	5 (15)	5 Oct 1912	Premierland, Whitechapel, London, England, UK	
114	Win	94–12–8	Tom Allen	PTS	10	28 Sep 1912	Premierland, Whitechapel, London, England, UK	
113	Win	93–12–8	Fred Blake	PTS	6	21 Sep 1912	Premierland, Whitechapel, London, England, UK	
112	Win	92–12–8	Sam Russell	PTS	10	14 Sep 1912	Premierland, Whitechapel, London, England, UK	
111	Win	91–12–8	Tom Clifford	PTS	6	7 Sep 1912	Premierland, Whitechapel, London, England, UK	
110	Loss	90–12–8	Fred Young Halsband	PTS	10	31 Aug 1912	Premierland, Whitechapel, London, England, UK	
109	Loss	90–11–8	Young Joe Brooks	PTS	15	10 Aug 1912	Premierland, Whitechapel, London, England, UK	
108	Win	90–10–8	Jack O'Neil	KO	3 (10)	27 Jul 1912	Premierland, Whitechapel, London, England, UK	
107	Win	89–10–8	Harry Wilson	PTS	10	17 Jul 1912	Premierland, Whitechapel, London, England, UK	
106	Win	88–10–8	Seaman Arthur Hayes	PTS	10	6 Jul 1912	Premierland, Whitechapel, London, England, UK	
105	Win	87–10–8	George Ruddick	PTS	10	22 Jun 1912	Premierland, Whitechapel, London, England, UK	
104	Win	86–10–8	Darkey Haley	PTS	10	10 Jun 1912	Premierland, Whitechapel, London, England, UK	
103	Win	85–10–8	Young Jack Chinney	PTS	6	8 Jun 1912	Premierland, Whitechapel, London, England, UK	
102	Win	84–10–8	Leon Victor Truffier	PTS	10	25 May 1912	Premierland, Whitechapel, London, England, UK	
101	Win	83–10–8	Jim Shires	TKO	2 (10)	18 May 1912	Premierland, Whitechapel, London, England, UK	
100	Win	82–10–8	Gus Venn	PTS	10	27 Apr 1912	Premierland, Whitechapel, London, England, UK	
99	Win	81–10–8	Gus Venn	TKO	7 (10)	6 Apr 1912	Premierland, Whitechapel, London, England, UK	
98	Win	80–10–8	Leon Victor Truffier	PTS	10	3 Apr 1912	Cirque de Paris, Paris, Paris, France	
97	Loss	79–10–8	Duke Lynch	KO	1 (15)	1 Apr 1912	Premierland, Whitechapel, London, England, UK	
96	Win	79–9–8	Jim Shires	KO	2 (10)	18 Mar 1912	Premierland, Whitechapel, London, England, UK	
95	Win	78–9–8	Allan Porter	PTS	10	16 Mar 1912	Premierland, Whitechapel, London, England, UK	
94	Win	77–9–8	George Buswell	PTS	10	2 Mar 1912	Premierland, Whitechapel, London, England, UK	
93	Win	76–9–8	Alf Mitchell	PTS	6	24 Feb 1912	Premierland, Whitechapel, London, England, UK	
92	Win	75–9–8	Tommy Mack	PTS	6	17 Feb 1912	Premierland, Whitechapel, London, England, UK	
91	Win	74–9–8	Duke Lynch	PTS	10	10 Feb 1912	Premierland, Whitechapel, London, England, UK	
90	Win	73–9–8	Harry Wilson	PTS	10	20 Jan 1912	Premierland, Whitechapel, London, England, UK	
89	Win	72–9–8	Billy Taylor	PTS	8	13 Jan 1912	London, England, UK	
88	Win	71–9–8	Jewey Murray	TKO	1 (10)	6 Jan 1912	Premierland, Whitechapel, London, England, UK	
87	Win	70–9–8	Eddie Foy	PTS	6	31 Dec 1911	Judaens AC, St George's, London, England, UK	
86	Win	69–9–8	Eddie Foy	PTS	6	25 Dec 1911	Judaens AC, St George's, London, England, UK	
85	Win	68–9–8	Jim Shires	PTS	10	16 Dec 1911	The Ring, Blackfriars Road, Southwark, London, England, UK	
84	Win	67–9–8	Billy Taylor	PTS	8	9 Dec 1911	Premierland, Whitechapel, London, England, UK	
83	Win	66–9–8	Jim Butler	TKO	2 (6)	4 Dec 1911	The Ring, Blackfriars Road Matinee, Southwark, London, England, UK	
82	Win	65–9–8	Frank Warner	PTS	6	2 Dec 1911	Hippodrome, Poplar, London, England, UK	
81	Win	64–9–8	Billy Griggs	KO	1 (6)	27 Nov 1911	The Ring, Blackfriars Road Matinee, Southwark, London, England, UK	
80	Win	63–9–8	Kid Olds	PTS	6	18 Nov 1911	Hippodrome, Poplar, London, England, UK	
79	Win	62–9–8	Alf Small	KO	2 (10)	12 Nov 1911	Judaens AC, St George's, London, England, UK	
78	Win	61–9–8	Jim Hales	PTS	6	9 Nov 1911	Pitfield Street Baths, Hoxton, London, England, UK	
77	Win	60–9–8	Dick Murray	PTS	10	2 Nov 1911	The Ring, Blackfriars Road, Southwark, London, England, UK	
76	Win	59–9–8	Tom Perkins	PTS	10	28 Oct 1911	Hippodrome, Poplar, London, England, UK	
75	Win	58–9–8	Jack Bunner	PTS	10	23 Oct 1911	Judaens AC, St George's, London, England, UK	
74	Win	57–9–8	Alf Small	PTS	6	21 Oct 1911	The Ring, Blackfriars Road, Southwark, London, England, UK	
73	Win	56–9–8	Tom Perkins	PTS	6	18 Oct 1911	Judaens AC, St George's, London, England, UK	
72	Win	55–9–8	Harry Ray	PTS	6	9 Oct 1911	The Ring, Blackfriars Road, Southwark, London, England, UK	
71	Win	54–9–8	Harry Ray	PTS	6	8 Oct 1911	The Ring, Blackfriars Road, Southwark, London, England, UK	
70	Win	53–9–8	Lew Cohen	KO	3 (6)	5 Oct 1911	Judaens AC, St George's, London, England, UK	
69	Win	52–9–8	Tom Perkins	PTS	6	30 Sep 1911	Hippodrome, Poplar, London, England, UK	
68	Win	51–9–8	Ted O'Neill	TKO	5 (6)	20 Sep 1911	Judaens AC, St George's, London, England, UK	
67	Win	50–9–8	Billy Smith	TKO	4 (6)	17 Sep 1911	Judaens AC, St George's, London, England, UK	
66	Draw	49–9–8	Tom Perkins	PTS	6	10 Sep 1911	Judaens AC, St George's, London, England, UK	
65	Draw	49–9–7	Fred Young Halsband	PTS	6	3 Sep 1911	Judaens AC, St George's, London, England, UK	
64	Win	49–9–6	Walter Bill Marshall	TKO	3 (6)	28 Aug 1911	The Ring, Blackfriars Road Matinee, Southwark, London, England, UK	
63	Win	48–9–6	Jack Harbour	DQ	3 (6)	27 Aug 1911	Judaens AC, St George's, London, England, UK	
62	Win	47–9–6	Tom Perkins	PTS	10	16 Aug 1911	Judaens AC, St George's, London, England, UK	
61	Win	46–9–6	Curley Hume	PTS	6	13 Aug 1911	Judaens AC, St George's, London, England, UK	
60	Win	45–9–6	George Marks	PTS	6	23 Jul 1911	Judaens AC, St George's, London, England, UK	
59	Win	44–9–6	Dick Murray	PTS	6	18 Jun 1911	Judaens AC, St George's, London, England, UK	
58	Win	43–9–6	Alf Small	KO	12 (12)	11 Jun 1911	Judaens AC, St George's, London, England, UK	
57	Win	42–9–6	Dick Murray	PTS	6	7 Jun 1911	Judaens AC, St George's, London, England, UK	
56	Win	41–9–6	Young Klein	KO	3 (6)	4 Jun 1911	Judaens AC, St George's, London, England, UK	
55	Win	40–9–6	Sid Venner	PTS	6	1 Jun 1911	Judaens AC, St George's, London, England, UK	
54	Win	39–9–6	Jack English	TKO	3 (6)	24 May 1911	Judaens AC, St George's, London, England, UK	
53	Draw	38–9–6	Jack Kid Greenstock	PTS	6	21 May 1911	Judaens AC, St George's, London, England, UK	
52	Win	38–9–5	Alf Small	PTS	10	14 May 1911	Judaens AC, St George's, London, England, UK	
51	Win	37–9–5	Joe Madden	PTS	12	5 May 1911	Judaens AC, St George's, London, England, UK	
50	Loss	36–9–5	Nat Young Brooks	PTS	15	30 Apr 1911	Judaens AC, St George's, London, England, UK	
49	Win	36–8–5	Young Jack Chinney	PTS	6	27 Apr 1911	The Chelsea Club, Fulham, London, England, UK	
48	Win	35–8–5	Young Hyams	PTS	6	24 Apr 1911	The Ring, Blackfriars Road, Southwark, London, England, UK	
47	Win	34–8–5	Private Jack Marks	TKO	7 (10)	23 Apr 1911	Judaens AC, St George's, London, England, UK	
46	Loss	33–8–5	Jack Fisher	PTS	6	23 Apr 1911	Poplar, London, England, UK	
45	Win	33–7–5	Nat Young Brooks	PTS	6	9 Apr 1911	Judaens AC, St George's, London, England, UK	
44	Win	32–7–5	Jack Guyon	TKO	3 (3)	5 Apr 1911	Judaens AC, St George's, London, England, UK	
43	Win	31–7–5	Young Joe Ross	PTS	3	5 Apr 1911	Judaens AC, St George's, London, England, UK	
42	Win	30–7–5	Charlie Young Smith	KO	4 (6)	29 Mar 1911	Judaens AC, St George's, London, England, UK	
41	Win	29–7–5	Jim Butler	KO	1 (6)	5 Mar 1911	Judaens AC, St George's, London, England, UK	
40	Win	28–7–5	Kid Levene	PTS	6	20 Feb 1911	The Ring, Blackfriars Road, Southwark, London, England, UK	
39	Draw	27–7–5	Joe Madden	PTS	6	19 Feb 1911	Judaens AC, St George's, London, England, UK	
38	Loss	27–7–4	Young Sullivan	PTS	6	12 Feb 1911	Judaens AC, St George's, London, England, UK	
37	Win	27–6–4	Billy Smith	KO	4 (6)	9 Feb 1911	Judaens AC, St George's, London, England, UK	
36	Win	26–6–4	Alf Small	TKO	2 (6)	5 Feb 1911	Judaens AC, St George's, London, England, UK	
35	Win	25–6–4	Young Klein	KO	3 (6)	1 Feb 1911	Judaens AC, St George's, London, England, UK	
34	Win	24–6–4	Joe Jacobs	PTS	6	29 Jan 1911	Judaens AC, St George's, London, England, UK	
33	Win	23–6–4	Joe Madden	PTS	6	25 Jan 1911	Olympia Annexe, Kensington, London, England, UK	
32	Win	22–6–4	Alf Jacobs	PTS	6	22 Jan 1911	Judaens AC, St George's, London, England, UK	
31	Win	21–6–4	Private Jack Marks	PTS	6	15 Jan 1911	Judaens AC, St George's, London, England, UK	
30	Win	20–6–4	Bill Marsh	PTS	6	8 Jan 1911	Judaens AC, St George's, London, England, UK	
29	Loss	19–6–4	Hugh Doyle	KO	3 (15)	21 Nov 1910	International Hall, Liverpool, Merseyside, England, UK	
28	Win	19–5–4	Boyo Lambert	PTS	6	13 Nov 1910	Judaens AC, St George's, London, England, UK	
27	Win	18–5–4	Curley Bume	PTS	6	9 Oct 1910	Judaens AC, St George's, London, England, UK	
26	Win	17–5–4	Sid Venner	PTS	6	16 Aug 1910	Judaens AC, St George's, London, England, UK	
25	Win	16–5–4	Young Smith	TKO	3 (6)	14 Aug 1910	Judaens AC, St George's, London, England, UK	
24	Win	15–5–4	Ted O'Neil	KO	5 (6)	7 Aug 1910	Judaens AC, St George's, London, England, UK	
23	Draw	14–5–4	Joe Madden	PTS	6	31 Jul 1910	Judaens AC, St George's, London, England, UK	
22	Draw	14–5–3	Jack Kid Greenstock	PTS	6	25 Jul 1910	Judaens AC, St George's, London, England, UK	
21	Win	14–5–2	Alf Jacobs	PTS	6	24 Jul 1910	Judaens AC, St George's, London, England, UK	
20	Draw	13–5–2	Jack Kid Greenstock	PTS	6	17 Jul 1910	Judaens AC, St George's, London, England, UK	
19	Win	13–5–1	Joe Madden	RTD	3 (6)	5 Jun 1910	Judaens AC, St George's, London, England, UK	
18	Win	12–5–1	Young Sullivan	PTS	6	29 May 1910	Judaens AC, St George's, London, England, UK	
17	Win	11–5–1	Young Jack Morris	PTS	6	22 May 1910	Judaens AC, St George's, London, England, UK	
16	Win	10–5–1	Kid Levene	PTS	6	15 May 1910	Judaens AC, St George's, London, England, UK	
15	Win	9–5–1	Private Jack Marks	PTS	6	28 Feb 1910	Judaens AC, St George's, London, England, UK	
14	Win	8–5–1	Piper Holmes	PTS	6	27 Feb 1910	Judaens AC, St George's, London, England, UK	
13	Win	7–5–1	George Powell	RTD	1 (6)	13 Feb 1910	Judaens AC, St George's, London, England, UK	
12	Loss	6–5–1	Boyo Lambert	PTS	6	5 Feb 1910	Winter Gardens, Peckham, London, England, UK	
11	Loss	6–4–1	Jim Brown	PTS	6	29 Jan 1910	Hippodrome, Peckham, London, England, UK	
10	Win	6–3–1	Alf Jacobs	PTS	6	16 Jan 1910	Judaens AC, St George's, London, England, UK	
9	Win	5–3–1	Bill Marsh	PTS	6	8 Jan 1910	Hippodrome, Peckham, London, England, UK	
8	Win	4–3–1	Kid Levene	TKO	3 (6)	19 Dec 1909	Judaens AC, St George's, London, England, UK	
7	Draw	3–3–1	Dick Hart	PTS	6	5 Dec 1909	Judaens AC, St George's, London, England, UK	
6	Win	3–3	Private Jack Marks	PTS	6	27 Nov 1909	Surrey Music Hall, Southwark, London, England, UK	
5	Loss	2–3	George Thomas	TKO	1 (3)	30 Oct 1909	Saddlers Wells Theatre, Clerkenwell, London, England, UK	
4	Win	2–2	Alf Cohen	PTS	6	9 Oct 1909	Judaeans AC, St George's, London, England, UK	
3	Win	1–2	Young Lipton	PTS	6	19 Sep 1909	Judaeans AC, St George's, London, England, UK	
2	Loss	0–2	Johnny Sharp	PTS	6	12 Sep 1909	Judaeans AC, St George's, London, England, UK	
1	Loss	0–1	Kid Da Costa	PTS	6	29 Aug 1909	Judaeans AC, St George's, London, England, UK	

=== Unofficial record ===
301 fights	232 wins	46 losses
By knockout	77	6
By decision	152	34
By disqualification	3	6
Draws	23	

Record with the inclusion of newspaper decisions in the win/loss/draw column.

No.	Result	Record	Opponent	Type	Round(s)	Date	Location	Notes
301	Win	232–46–23	Johnny Basham	TKO	3 (10)	13 Dec 1929	Pitfield Street Baths, Hoxton, London, England, UK	
300	Loss	231–46–23	Charley Belanger	DQ	1 (15)	17 Dec 1928	Coliseum, Toronto, Ontario, Canada	For Commonwealth light heavyweight title
299	Loss	231–45–23	Maxie Rosenbloom	DQ	6 (15)	31 Jul 1928	Queensboro Stadium, Long Island City, New York City, New York, U.S.	
298	Draw	231–44–23	Johnny Squires	KO	1 (10)	7 Jan 1928	Town Hall, Johannesburg, Gauteng, Union of South Africa	
297	Win	231–44–22	Alec Storbeck	KO	1 (10)	3 Dec 1927	Town Hall, Johannesburg, Gauteng, Union of South Africa	
296	Win	230–44–22	Joe Rolfe	RTD	11 (15)	15 Nov 1927	Premierland, Whitechapel, London, England, UK	
295	Win	229–44–22	Robert Amssens	TKO	1 (15)	2 Oct 1927	Premierland, Whitechapel, London, England, UK	
294	Win	228–44–22	Ted Coveney	TKO	6 (15)	11 Sep 1927	Premierland, Whitechapel, London, England, UK	
293	Win	227–44–22	Nol Steenhorst	RTD	9 (15)	28 Aug 1927	Premierland, Whitechapel, London, England, UK	
292	Win	226–44–22	Jim Carr	KO	3 (15)	14 Aug 1927	Premierland, Whitechapel, London, England, UK	
291	Win	225–44–22	Joe Green	RTD	4 (15)	4 Aug 1927	Skating Rink, Ilford, London, England, UK	
290	Win	224–44–22	Billy Mattick	DQ	5 (20)	21 Mar 1926	Premierland, Whitechapel, London, England, UK	
289	Win	223–44–22	Billy Pritchard	TKO	10 (15)	7 Mar 1926	Premierland, Whitechapel, London, England, UK	
288	Loss	222–44–22	Len Johnson	RTD	10 (20)	27 Nov 1925	King's Hall, Belle Vue, Manchester, Lancashire, England, UK	
287	Loss	222–43–22	Simon Rosman	DQ	8 (15)	8 Nov 1925	Premierland, Whitechapel, London, England, UK	
286	Loss	222–42–22	Marcel Thuru	DQ	1 (15)	8 Oct 1925	Royal Albert Hall, Kensington, London, England, UK	
285	Win	222–41–22	Bob Sage	PTS	10	10 Jul 1925	Legion Stadium, Hollywood, California, U.S.	
284	Loss	221–41–22	Tommy Milligan	DQ	5 (20)	19 Mar 1925	Royal Albert Hall, Kensington, London, England, UK	
283	Win	221–40–22	Francis Charles	PTS	20	22 Jan 1925	Royal Albert Hall, Kensington, London, England, UK	
282	Loss	220–40–22	Tommy Milligan	PTS	20	26 Nov 1924	Industrial Hall, Edinburgh, Scotland, UK	Lost EBU, BBBofC British, and Commonwealth welterweight titles
281	Win	220–39–22	Johnny Brown	PTS	20	3 Jul 1924	Royal Albert Hall, Kensington, London, England, UK	Won EBU, BBBofC British, and Commonwealth welterweight titles
280	Draw	219–39–22	Piet Hobin	PTS	20	1 Jun 1924	Stade Buffalo, Montrouge, Hauts-de-Seine, France	
279	Win	219–39–21	Erich Milenz	KO	8 (10)	12 Apr 1924	Sportpalast, Schoeneberg, Berlin, Weimar Republic	
278	Draw	218–39–21	Chic Nelson	PTS	15	6 Apr 1924	Zirkus Busch, Hamburg, Weimar Republic	
277	Win	218–39–20	Francois Charles	PTS	15	18 Mar 1924	Cirque de Paris, Paris, Paris, France	
276	Win	217–39–20	Bruno Frattini	KO	17 (20)	12 Feb 1924	Palazzo dello Sport (Pad. 3 Fiera), Milan, Lombardia, Kingdom of Italy	
275	Win	216–39–20	Sergeant Sid Pape	RTD	2 (20)	28 Jan 1924	Windsor Hall, Bradford, Yorkshire, U.S.	
274	Win	215–39–20	Fred Davies	PTS	20	26 Dec 1923	Premierland, Whitechapel, London, England, UK	
273	Win	214–39–20	Fred Archer	PTS	20	8 Nov 1923	Premierland, Whitechapel, London, England, UK	
272	Win	213–39–20	Frank Burns	PTS	20	4 Oct 1923	Premierland, Whitechapel, London, England, UK	
271	Loss	212–39–20	Augie Ratner	PTS	20	30 Jul 1923	Royal Albert Hall, Kensington, London, England, UK	
270	Loss	212–38–20	Roland Todd	PTS	20	15 Feb 1923	Royal Albert Hall, Kensington, London, England, UK	Lost EBU, BBBofC British, and Commonwealth middleweight titles
269	Win	212–37–20	Roland Todd	PTS	20	20 Nov 1922	Holland Park Rink, Kensington, London, England, UK	Won EBU, BBBofC British, and Commonwealth middleweight titles
268	Win	211–37–20	Marcel Thomas	TKO	4 (15)	4 Sep 1922	Premierland, Whitechapel, London, England, UK	
267	Win	210–37–20	Frank Burns	KO	11 (20)	19 Jun 1922	Holland Park Rink, Kensington, London, England, UK	
266	Loss	209–37–20	Georges Carpentier	KO	1 (20)	5 May 1922	The Dome, Brighton, Sussex, England, UK	For EBU and world light heavyweight titles
265	Win	209–36–20	Tom Gummer	KO	1 (20)	17 Feb 1922	The Dome, Brighton, Sussex, England, UK	
264	Win	208–36–20	Boy McCormick	TKO	14 (20)	17 Nov 1921	Royal Albert Hall, Kensington, London, England, UK	Won BBBofC british light heavyweight title
263	Win	207–36–20	Johnny Basham	RTD	12 (20)	14 Oct 1921	Royal Albert Hall, Kensington, London, England, UK	Retained EBU and BBBofC British welterweight titles
262	Win	206–36–20	Ernie Barrieau	KO	10 (10)	20 Sep 1921	Arena, Toronto, Ontario, Canada	
261	Win	205–36–20	Jack Bloomfield	PTS	20	27 Jun 1921	Holland Park Rink, Kensington, London, England, UK	Won vacant BBBofC middleweight title
260	Loss	204–36–20	Augie Ratner	PTS	15	13 Apr 1921	Manhattan Casino, New York City, New York, U.S.	
259	Loss	204–35–20	Nate Siegel	PTS	10	8 Apr 1921	Arena, Boston, Massachusetts, U.S.	
258	Win	204–34–20	Jack Perry	NWS	10	14 Mar 1921	Roller Palace Rink, Detroit, Michigan, U.S.	
257	Loss	203–34–20	Jack Britton	UD	15	7 Feb 1921	Madison Square Garden, New York City, New York, U.S.	For world welterweight title
256	Win	203–33–20	Johnny Basham	KO	19 (20)	19 Nov 1920	Royal Albert Hall, Kensington, London, England, UK	Retained EBU, BBBofC British, and Commonwealth welterweight titles
255	Win	202–33–20	Marcel Thomas	NWS	8	12 Oct 1920	Westside Ballpark, Jersey City, New Jersey, U.S.	
254	Loss	201–33–20	Mike O'Dowd	NWS	12	23 Sep 1920	Westside Ballpark, Jersey City, New Jersey, U.S.	
253	Win	201–32–20	Johnny Basham	RTD	9 (20)	9 Jun 1920	Olympia, Kensington, London, England, UK	Won EBU, BBBofC British, and Commonwealth welterweight titles
252	Win	200–32–20	Kid Doyle	RTD	5 (20)	30 Apr 1920	Holborn Stadium, Holborn, London, England, UK	
251	Win	199–32–20	Kid Doyle	RTD	11 (20)	5 Apr 1920	Liverpool Stadium, Pudsey Street, Liverpool, Merseyside, England, UK	
250	Win	198–32–20	Johnny Bee	KO	4 (20)	11 Mar 1920	Holborn Stadium, Holborn, London, England, UK	Won vacant BBBofC British middleweight title
249	Win	197–32–20	Gus Platts	RTD	18 (20)	4 Mar 1920	Edmund Rd Drill Hall, Sheffield, Yorkshire, England, UK	
248	Win	196–32–20	Jerry Shea	KO	1 (20)	28 Feb 1920	Pavilion, Mountain Ash, Wales, UK	
247	Win	195–32–20	Maurice Prunier	KO	6 (20)	14 Feb 1920	Cirque de Paris, Paris, Paris, France	
246	Win	194–32–20	Frank Moody	KO	1 (15)	13 Jan 1920	Free Trade Hall, Manchester, Lancashire, England, UK	
245	Win	193–32–20	Matt Wells	RTD	12 (20)	26 Dec 1919	Royal Albert Hall, Kensington, London, England, UK	
244	Win	192–32–20	Jake Abel	PTS	10	28 Oct 1919	Armory Auditorium, Atlanta, Georgia, U.S.	
243	Win	191–32–20	Jimmy McCabe	KO	1 (10)	16 Oct 1919	Atlantic City S.C., Atlantic City, New Jersey, U.S.	
242	Win	190–32–20	K.O. Willie Loughlin	KO	1 (10)	11 Oct 1919	Arena, Boston, Massachusetts, U.S.	
241	Loss	189–32–20	Mike O'Dowd	NWS	8	1 Sep 1919	Arena, Syracuse, New York, U.S.	World middleweight title at stake; (via KO only)
240	Draw	189–31–20	Steve Latzo	NWS	8	4 Aug 1919	Shibe Park, Philadelphia, Pennsylvania, U.S.	
239	Loss	189–31–19	Jack Britton	NWS	8	28 Jul 1919	Armory A.A., Jersey City, New Jersey, U.S.	World welterweight title at stake; (via KO only)
238	Win	189–30–19	Steve Latzo	NWS	6	14 Jul 1919	Shibe Park, Philadelphia, Pennsylvania, U.S.	
237	Loss	188–30–19	Jack Britton	KO	9 (12)	17 Mar 1919	Arena, Boston, Massachusetts, U.S.	Lost world welterweight title
236	Draw	188–29–19	Johnny Griffiths	NWS	8	10 Mar 1919	Lyric Theater, Memphis, Tennessee, U.S.	Retained world welterweight title at stake; (via KO only)
235	Win	188–29–18	Georges Rivet	NWS	10	13 Jan 1919	Sohmer Park, Montreal, Quebec, Canada	
234	Draw	187–29–18	Bryan Downey	NWS	15	1 Jan 1919	Memorial Hall, Columbus, Ohio, U.S.	
233	Draw	187–29–17	Benny Leonard	NWS	8	23 Sep 1918	Weidenmeyer's Park, Newark, New Jersey, U.S.	World welterweight title at stake; (via KO only)
232	Win	187–29–16	Walter Mohr	NWS	8	17 Aug 1918	Westside Ballpark, Jersey City, New Jersey, U.S.	
231	Win	186–29–16	Tommy Robson	PTS	12	13 Aug 1918	Arena, Boston, Massachusetts, U.S.	
230	Win	185–29–16	Johnny Griffiths	NWS	20	4 Jul 1918	East Market Street Gardens, Akron, Ohio, U.S.	World welterweight title at stake; (via KO only)
229	Win	184–29–16	Tommy Robson	PTS	12	25 Jun 1918	Arena, Boston, Massachusetts, U.S.	
228	Loss	183–29–16	Jack Britton	NWS	6	20 Jun 1918	Madison Square Garden, New York City, New York, U.S.	
227	Win	183–28–16	Johnny Tillman	UD	20	17 May 1918	Stockyards Stadium, Denver, Colorado, U.S.	Retained world welterweight title
226	Draw	182–28–16	Jack Britton	NWS	10	2 Mar 1918	Town Hall, Scranton, Pennsylvania, U.S.	World welterweight title at stake; (via KO only)
225	Loss	182–28–15	Joe Eagan	NWS	10	16 Apr 1918	Southside A.C., Milwaukee, Wisconsin, U.S.	
224	Loss	182–27–15	Jack Britton	NWS	10	6 Mar 1918	Armory Auditorium, Atlanta, Georgia, U.S.	World welterweight title at stake; (via KO only)
223	Win	182–26–15	Willie Langford	NWS	10	26 Feb 1918	Broadway Auditorium, Buffalo, New York, U.S.	
222	Draw	181–26–15	Jakob "Soldier" Bartfield	NWS	6	25 Feb 1918	Olympia A.C., Philadelphia, Pennsylvania, U.S.	
221	Win	181–26–14	Lockport Jimmy Duffy	TKO	1 (15)	18 Feb 1918	Dreamland Rink, San Francisco, California, U.S.	
220	Win	180–26–14	Johnny Tillman	NWS	12	4 Feb 1918	Olympia A.C., Philadelphia, Pennsylvania, U.S.	
219	Win	179–26–14	Jakob "Soldier" Bartfield	NWS	12	23 Jan 1918	Massey Hall, Toronto, Ontario, Canada	
218	Draw	178–26–14	Jakob "Soldier" Bartfield	NWS	12	14 Jan 1918	Memorial Hall, Columbus, Ohio, U.S.	
217	Win	178–26–13	Bryan Downey	NWS	12	17 Dec 1917	Memorial Hall, Columbus, Ohio, U.S.	World welterweight title at stake; (via KO only)
216	Win	177–26–13	Johnny McCarthy	PTS	4	13 Nov 1917	Dreamland Rink, San Francisco, California, U.S.	
215	Draw	176–26–13	Battling Ortega	PTS	4	24 Oct 1917	Arena, Emeryville, California, U.S.	
214	Win	176–26–12	Frank Carbone	NWS	10	22 Sep 1917	Broadway S.C., New York City, New York, U.S.	
213	Win	175–26–12	Italian Joe Gans	NWS	10	15 Sep 1917	Broadway S.C., New York City, New York, U.S.	
212	Win	174–26–12	Jimmy O'Hagan	NWS	10	14 Sep 1917	St. Nicholas Arena, New York City, New York, U.S.	
211	Win	173–26–12	Jakob "Soldier" Bartfield	NWS	10	11 Sep 1917	Airdome A.C., Rochester, New York, U.S.	
210	Loss	172–26–12	Jakob "Soldier" Bartfield	NWS	10	3 Sep 1917	Broadway Auditorium, Buffalo, New York, U.S.	
209	Win	172–25–12	Albert Badoud	KO	1 (12)	31 Aug 1917	St. Nicholas Arena, New York City, New York, U.S.	
208	Loss	171–25–12	Mike O'Dowd	PTS	12	28 Aug 1917	Arena, Boston, Massachusetts, U.S.	
207	Win	171–24–12	Mike O'Dowd	NWS	10	17 Aug 1917	St. Nicholas Arena, New York City, New York, U.S.	
206	Win	170–24–12	Jimmy O'Hagan	NWS	10	7 Aug 1917	Convention Hall, Saratoga, New York, U.S.	
205	Loss	169–24–12	Johnny Griffiths	NWS	15	4 Jul 1917	Grossvater Park, Akron, Ohio, U.S.	
204	Win	169–23–12	Jack Britton	PTS	20	25 Jun 1917	Westwood Field, Dayton, Ohio, U.S.	Won world welterweight title
203	Win	168–23–12	Jack Britton	NWS	10	14 Jun 1917	St. Nicholas Arena, New York City, New York, U.S.	World welterweight title at stake; (via KO only)
202	Win	167–23–12	Jack Britton	NWS	10	6 Jun 1917	Coliseum, Saint Louis, Missouri, U.S.	World welterweight title at stake; (via KO only)
201	Win	166–23–12	Mike O'Dowd	NWS	10	24 May 1917	St. Nicholas Arena, New York City, New York, U.S.	
200	Win	165–23–12	Joe Eagan	PTS	12	22 May 1917	Arena (Armory A.A.), Boston, Massachusetts, U.S.	
199	Win	164–23–12	Jack Britton	NWS	10	19 May 1917	Massey Hall, Toronto, Ontario, Canada	World welterweight title at stake; (via KO only)
198	Win	163–23–12	Jimmy O'Hagen	KO	2 (10)	4 May 1917	Harlem S.C., New York City, New York, U.S.	
197	Win	162–23–12	Johnny Griffiths	NWS	12	30 Apr 1917	Coliseum, Columbus, Ohio, U.S.	
196	Win	161–23–12	Billy Weeks	KO	12 (12)	12 Apr 1917	Gymnastic Club, Dayton, Ohio, U.S.	
195	Win	160–23–12	Jimmy Coffey	KO	1 (12)	4 Apr 1917	Hunts Point Palace, New York City, New York, U.S.	
194	Win	159–23–12	Jack Britton	NWS	10	26 Mar 1917	Heuck's Opera House, Cincinnati, Ohio, U.S.	World welterweight title at stake; (via KO only)
193	Win	158–23–12	Willie Moore	KO	1 (10)	19 Mar 1917	Hunts Point Palace, New York City, New York, U.S.	
192	Win	157–23–12	Johnny Griffiths	NWS	12	26 Feb 1917	East Market Street Gardens, Akron, Ohio, U.S.	
191	Win	156–23–12	Kid Graves	KO	9 (10)	6 Feb 1917	Broadway S.C., New York City, New York, U.S.	
190	Win	155–23–12	Sam Robideau	PTS	15	31 Jan 1917	Marieville Gardens, North Providence, Rhode Island, U.S.	
189	Win	154–23–12	Johnny Griffiths	NWS	10	29 Jan 1917	Hunts Point Palace, New York City, New York, U.S.	
188	Draw	153–23–12	Johnny Griffiths	NWS	10	21 Dec 1916	Gray's Armory, Cleveland, Ohio, U.S.	
187	Win	153–23–11	Johnny Griffiths	NWS	10	23 Nov 1916	Gray's Armory, Cleveland, Ohio, U.S.	
186	Draw	152–23–11	Jack Britton	PTS	12	14 Nov 1916	Arena, Boston, Massachusetts, U.S.	For world welterweight title
185	Win	152–23–10	Young Denny	NWS	12	24 Oct 1916	Coliseum, Saint Louis, Missouri, U.S.	
184	Loss	151–23–10	Jack Britton	PTS	12	17 Oct 1916	Arena, Boston, Massachusetts, U.S.	For world welterweight title
183	Win	151–22–10	Mike Glover	PTS	12	13 Jun 1916	Arena (Armory A.A.), Boston, Massachusetts, U.S.	
182	Win	150–22–10	Eddie Moha	KO	12 (15)	24 May 1916	Gymnastic Club, Dayton, Ohio, U.S.	
181	Loss	149–22–10	Mike Gibbons	NWS	10	16 May 1916	Madison Square Garden, New York City, New York, U.S.	World middleweight title claim at stake; (via KO only)
180	Loss	149–21–10	Jack Britton	PTS	20	24 Apr 1916	Louisiana Auditorium, New Orleans, Louisiana, U.S.	Lost world welterweight title
179	Win	149–20–10	Jack Abel	PTS	8	19 Apr 1916	Tommy Burns Arena, New Orleans, Louisiana, U.S.	
178	Win	148–20–10	Harry Stone	PTS	20	1 Mar 1916	Tommy Burns Arena, New Orleans, Louisiana, U.S.	Retained world welterweight title
177	Win	147–20–10	Harry Trendall	KO	7 (8)	24 Feb 1916	Coliseum, Saint Louis, Missouri, U.S.	
176	Loss	146–20–10	Lockport Jimmy Duffy	NWS	10	21 Feb 1916	Broadway Auditorium, Buffalo, New York, U.S.	World welterweight title at stake; (via KO only)
175	Loss	146–19–10	Jack Britton	NWS	10	15 Feb 1916	Broadway Auditorium, New York City, New York, U.S.	World welterweight title at stake; (via KO only)
174	Loss	146–18–10	Jakob "Soldier" Bartfield	NWS	10	9 Feb 1916	Broadway Auditorium, Buffalo, New York, U.S.	
173	Win	146–17–10	Marty Farrell	NWS	6	5 Feb 1916	National A.C., Philadelphia, Pennsylvania, U.S.	
172	Loss	145–17–10	Jack Britton	NWS	10	20 Jan 1916	Broadway Auditorium, Buffalo, New York, U.S.	World welterweight title at stake; (via KO only)
171	Win	145–16–10	Kid Graves	NWS	10	17 Jan 1916	Auditorium, Milwaukee, Wisconsin, U.S.	World welterweight title at stake; (via KO only)
170	Draw	144–16–10	Willie KO Brennan	NWS	10	1 Jan 1916	Broadway Auditorium, Buffalo, New York, U.S.	
169	Win	144–16–9	Willie Ritchie	NWS	10	28 Dec 1915	Madison Square Garden, New York City, New York, U.S.	World welterweight title at stake; (via KO only)
168	Win	143–16–9	Young Neil	PTS	15	3 Dec 1915	Gymnastic Club, Dayton, Ohio, U.S.	
167	Loss	142–16–9	Mike Glover	PTS	12	30 Nov 1915	Arena (Atlas A.A.), Boston, Massachusetts, U.S.	
166	Win	142–15–9	Lockport Jimmy Duffy	KO	1 (12)	23 Nov 1915	Arena, Boston, Massachusetts, U.S.	Retained world welterweight title
165	Win	141–15–9	Milburn Saylor	PTS	12	2 Nov 1915	Arena (Atlas A.A.), Boston, Massachusetts, U.S.	
164	Win	140–15–9	Joe Mandot	PTS	12	26 Oct 1915	Arena, Boston, Massachusetts, U.S.	Retained world welterweight title
163	Win	139–15–9	Willie Moore	NWS	6	18 Oct 1915	Olympia A.C., Philadelphia, Pennsylvania, U.S.	
162	Win	138–15–9	Jack Britton	PTS	12	28 Sep 1915	Arena (Atlas A.A.), Boston, Massachusetts, U.S.	Retained world welterweight title
161	Win	137–15–9	Jack Britton	PTS	12	31 Aug 1915	Arena, Boston, Massachusetts, U.S.	Won world welterweight title
160	Win	136–15–9	Fighting Zunner	NWS	10	17 Aug 1915	Bison Stadium, Buffalo, New York, U.S.	
159	Win	135–15–9	Kid Curley	NWS	10	11 Aug 1915	Bison Stadium, Buffalo, New York, U.S.	
158	Win	134–15–9	Mike Glover	PTS	12	3 Aug 1915	Arena (Atlas A.A.), Boston, Massachusetts, U.S.	
157	Win	133–15–9	Charley White	NWS	10	21 Jul 1915	St. Nicholas Arena, New York City, New York, U.S.	
156	Win	132–15–9	Mike Mazie	NWS	10	25 Jun 1915	Brown's Gym A.A., Far Rockaway, New York City, New York, U.S.	
155	Win	131–15–9	Johnny Marto	NWS	10	23 Jun 1915	St. Nicholas Arena, New York City, New York, U.S.	
154	Win	130–15–9	Kid Graves	NWS	10	9 Jun 1915	St. Nicholas Arena, New York City, New York, U.S.	
153	Win	129–15–9	Johnny Lustig	PTS	10	30 Mar 1915	Sohmer Park, Montreal, Quebec, Canada	
152	Win	128–15–9	Johnny Lore	NWS	10	16 Apr 1915	Canadian A.C., Montreal, Quebec, Canada	
151	Win	127–15–9	Harry Lenny	NWS	10	6 Apr 1915	Federal A.C., New York City, New York, U.S.	
150	Loss	126–15–9	Jack Britton	NWS	10	26 Mar 1915	135th Street A.C., New York City, New York, U.S.	
149	Win	126–14–9	Frankie Mack	PTS	20	10 Mar 1915	Estadio Tropical, Havana, Cuba	
148	Win	125–14–9	Willie Moore	NWS	6	1 Jan 1915	National A.C., Philadelphia, Pennsylvania, U.S.	
147	Win	124–14–9	Young Jack O'Brien	NWS	6	25 Dec 1914	National A.C., Philadelphia, Pennsylvania, U.S.	
146	Win	123–14–9	Phil Bloom	NWS	10	9 Nov 1914	Madison Square Garden, New York City, New York, U.S.	
145	Win	122–14–9	Bobby Moore	PTS	20	1 Aug 1914	Baker's Pavilion, Melbourne, Victoria, Australia	
144	Loss	121–14–9	Herb McCoy	PTS	20	11 Jul 1914	Baker's Pavilion, Melbourne, Victoria, Australia	
143	Win	121–13–9	Joe Shugrue	PTS	20	27 Jun 1914	Sydney Stadium, Sydney, New South Wales, UK, Australia	
142	Win	120–13–9	Hughie Mehegan	PTS	20	13 Jun 1914	Sydney Stadium, Sydney, New South Wales, UK, Australia	
141	Win	119–13–9	Herb McCoy	PTS	20	30 May 1914	Sydney Stadium, Sydney, New South Wales, UK, Australia	
140	Win	118–13–9	Ted Saunders	KO	6 (10)	18 Mar 1914	Drill Hall, Coventry, West Midlands, England, UK	
139	Win	117–13–9	Harry Kid Berry	KO	3 (15)	14 Mar 1914	Premierland, Whitechapel, London, England, UK	
138	Win	116–13–9	Paul Til	DQ	12 (20)	2 Feb 1914	Premierland, Whitechapel, London, England, UK	Retained EBU featherweight title
137	Win	115–13–9	George Buswell	TKO	2 (20)	5 Jan 1914	The Ring, Blackfriars Road, Southwark, London, England, UK	
136	Win	114–13–9	Alec Lambert	TKO	17 (20)	6 Oct 1913	National Sporting Club, Covent Garden, London, England, UK	Won vacant EBU and National Sporting Club featherweight titles
135	Win	113–13–9	Fernand Quendreux	KO	10 (15)	15 Sep 1913	The Ring, Blackfriars Road, Southwark, London, England, UK	
134	Win	112–13–9	Harry Sterling	PTS	15	23 Aug 1913	The Ring, Blackfriars Road, Southwark, London, England, UK	
133	Win	111–13–9	Duke Lynch	PTS	15	26 Jul 1913	The Ring, Blackfriars Road, Southwark, London, England, UK	
132	Win	110–13–9	Harry Sterling	RTD	7 (15)	19 Jul 1913	The Ring, Blackfriars Road, Southwark, London, England, UK	
131	Win	109–13–9	Joe Starmer	PTS	15	2 Jun 1913	National Sporting Club, Covent Garden, London, England, UK	
130	Win	108–13–9	Young Joe Brooks	PTS	15	7 Apr 1913	National Sporting Club, Covent Garden, London, England, UK	
129	Win	107–13–9	Johnny Condon	PTS	20	3 Mar 1913	The Ring, Blackfriars Road, Southwark, London, England, UK	
128	Win	106–13–9	Johnny Condon	PTS	20	27 Jan 1913	The Ring, Blackfriars Road, Southwark, London, England, UK	
127	Draw	105–13–9	Nat Williams	PTS	15	16 Jan 1913	Liverpool Stadium, Pudsey Street, Liverpool, Merseyside, England, UK	
126	Win	105–13–8	George Buswell	TKO	14 (15)	4 Jan 1913	The Ring, Blackfriars Road, Southwark, London, England, UK	
125	Win	104–13–8	Jim Lloyd	PTS	10	2 Jan 1913	Liverpool Stadium, Pudsey Street, Liverpool, Merseyside, England, UK	
124	Win	103–13–8	Harry Kid Berry	PTS	15	21 Dec 1912	Premierland, Whitechapel, London, England, UK	
123	Win	102–13–8	Jim Shires	PTS	10	16 Dec 1912	The Ring, Blackfriars Road, Southwark, London, England, UK	
122	Win	101–13–8	Private Jack Harrison	KO	3 (6)	2 Dec 1912	National Sporting Club, Covent Garden, London, England, UK	
121	Win	100–13–8	George Ruddick	PTS	12	30 Nov 1912	Premierland, Whitechapel, London, England, UK	
120	Win	99–13–8	Alf Small	KO	5 (10)	16 Nov 1912	Premierland, Whitechapel, London, England, UK	
119	Win	98–13–8	Fred Young Halsband	PTS	10	9 Nov 1912	National Sporting Club, Covent Garden, London, England, UK	
118	Win	97–13–8	Jim Campbell	PTS	6	21 Oct 1912	Premierland, Whitechapel, London, England, UK	
117	Win	96–13–8	Young Jack Chinney	KO	3 (10)	19 Oct 1912	Premierland, Whitechapel, London, England, UK	
116	Win	95–13–8	Jim Lloyd	PTS	10	12 Oct 1912	Premierland, Whitechapel, London, England, UK	
115	Loss	94–13–8	Con Houghton	DQ	5 (15)	5 Oct 1912	Premierland, Whitechapel, London, England, UK	
114	Win	94–12–8	Tom Allen	PTS	10	28 Sep 1912	Premierland, Whitechapel, London, England, UK	
113	Win	93–12–8	Fred Blake	PTS	6	21 Sep 1912	Premierland, Whitechapel, London, England, UK	
112	Win	92–12–8	Sam Russell	PTS	10	14 Sep 1912	Premierland, Whitechapel, London, England, UK	
111	Win	91–12–8	Tom Clifford	PTS	6	7 Sep 1912	Premierland, Whitechapel, London, England, UK	
110	Loss	90–12–8	Fred Young Halsband	PTS	10	31 Aug 1912	Premierland, Whitechapel, London, England, UK	
109	Loss	90–11–8	Young Joe Brooks	PTS	15	10 Aug 1912	Premierland, Whitechapel, London, England, UK	
108	Win	90–10–8	Jack O'Neil	KO	3 (10)	27 Jul 1912	Premierland, Whitechapel, London, England, UK	
107	Win	89–10–8	Harry Wilson	PTS	10	17 Jul 1912	Premierland, Whitechapel, London, England, UK	
106	Win	88–10–8	Seaman Arthur Hayes	PTS	10	6 Jul 1912	Premierland, Whitechapel, London, England, UK	
105	Win	87–10–8	George Ruddick	PTS	10	22 Jun 1912	Premierland, Whitechapel, London, England, UK	
104	Win	86–10–8	Darkey Haley	PTS	10	10 Jun 1912	Premierland, Whitechapel, London, England, UK	
103	Win	85–10–8	Young Jack Chinney	PTS	6	8 Jun 1912	Premierland, Whitechapel, London, England, UK	
102	Win	84–10–8	Leon Victor Truffier	PTS	10	25 May 1912	Premierland, Whitechapel, London, England, UK	
101	Win	83–10–8	Jim Shires	TKO	2 (10)	18 May 1912	Premierland, Whitechapel, London, England, UK	
100	Win	82–10–8	Gus Venn	PTS	10	27 Apr 1912	Premierland, Whitechapel, London, England, UK	
99	Win	81–10–8	Gus Venn	TKO	7 (10)	6 Apr 1912	Premierland, Whitechapel, London, England, UK	
98	Win	80–10–8	Leon Victor Truffier	PTS	10	3 Apr 1912	Cirque de Paris, Paris, Paris, France	
97	Loss	79–10–8	Duke Lynch	KO	1 (15)	1 Apr 1912	Premierland, Whitechapel, London, England, UK	
96	Win	79–9–8	Jim Shires	KO	2 (10)	18 Mar 1912	Premierland, Whitechapel, London, England, UK	
95	Win	78–9–8	Allan Porter	PTS	10	16 Mar 1912	Premierland, Whitechapel, London, England, UK	
94	Win	77–9–8	George Buswell	PTS	10	2 Mar 1912	Premierland, Whitechapel, London, England, UK	
93	Win	76–9–8	Alf Mitchell	PTS	6	24 Feb 1912	Premierland, Whitechapel, London, England, UK	
92	Win	75–9–8	Tommy Mack	PTS	6	17 Feb 1912	Premierland, Whitechapel, London, England, UK	
91	Win	74–9–8	Duke Lynch	PTS	10	10 Feb 1912	Premierland, Whitechapel, London, England, UK	
90	Win	73–9–8	Harry Wilson	PTS	10	20 Jan 1912	Premierland, Whitechapel, London, England, UK	
89	Win	72–9–8	Billy Taylor	PTS	8	13 Jan 1912	London, England, UK	
88	Win	71–9–8	Jewey Murray	TKO	1 (10)	6 Jan 1912	Premierland, Whitechapel, London, England, UK	
87	Win	70–9–8	Eddie Foy	PTS	6	31 Dec 1911	Judaens AC, St George's, London, England, UK	
86	Win	69–9–8	Eddie Foy	PTS	6	25 Dec 1911	Judaens AC, St George's, London, England, UK	
85	Win	68–9–8	Jim Shires	PTS	10	16 Dec 1911	The Ring, Blackfriars Road, Southwark, London, England, UK	
84	Win	67–9–8	Billy Taylor	PTS	8	9 Dec 1911	Premierland, Whitechapel, London, England, UK	
83	Win	66–9–8	Jim Butler	TKO	2 (6)	4 Dec 1911	The Ring, Blackfriars Road Matinee, Southwark, London, England, UK	
82	Win	65–9–8	Frank Warner	PTS	6	2 Dec 1911	Hippodrome, Poplar, London, England, UK	
81	Win	64–9–8	Billy Griggs	KO	1 (6)	27 Nov 1911	The Ring, Blackfriars Road Matinee, Southwark, London, England, UK	
80	Win	63–9–8	Kid Olds	PTS	6	18 Nov 1911	Hippodrome, Poplar, London, England, UK	
79	Win	62–9–8	Alf Small	KO	2 (10)	12 Nov 1911	Judaens AC, St George's, London, England, UK	
78	Win	61–9–8	Jim Hales	PTS	6	9 Nov 1911	Pitfield Street Baths, Hoxton, London, England, UK	
77	Win	60–9–8	Dick Murray	PTS	10	2 Nov 1911	The Ring, Blackfriars Road, Southwark, London, England, UK	
76	Win	59–9–8	Tom Perkins	PTS	10	28 Oct 1911	Hippodrome, Poplar, London, England, UK	
75	Win	58–9–8	Jack Bunner	PTS	10	23 Oct 1911	Judaens AC, St George's, London, England, UK	
74	Win	57–9–8	Alf Small	PTS	6	21 Oct 1911	The Ring, Blackfriars Road, Southwark, London, England, UK	
73	Win	56–9–8	Tom Perkins	PTS	6	18 Oct 1911	Judaens AC, St George's, London, England, UK	
72	Win	55–9–8	Harry Ray	PTS	6	9 Oct 1911	The Ring, Blackfriars Road, Southwark, London, England, UK	
71	Win	54–9–8	Harry Ray	PTS	6	8 Oct 1911	The Ring, Blackfriars Road, Southwark, London, England, UK	
70	Win	53–9–8	Lew Cohen	KO	3 (6)	5 Oct 1911	Judaens AC, St George's, London, England, UK	
69	Win	52–9–8	Tom Perkins	PTS	6	30 Sep 1911	Hippodrome, Poplar, London, England, UK	
68	Win	51–9–8	Ted O'Neill	TKO	5 (6)	20 Sep 1911	Judaens AC, St George's, London, England, UK	
67	Win	50–9–8	Billy Smith	TKO	4 (6)	17 Sep 1911	Judaens AC, St George's, London, England, UK	
66	Draw	49–9–8	Tom Perkins	PTS	6	10 Sep 1911	Judaens AC, St George's, London, England, UK	
65	Draw	49–9–7	Fred Young Halsband	PTS	6	3 Sep 1911	Judaens AC, St George's, London, England, UK	
64	Win	49–9–6	Walter Bill Marshall	TKO	3 (6)	28 Aug 1911	The Ring, Blackfriars Road Matinee, Southwark, London, England, UK	
63	Win	48–9–6	Jack Harbour	DQ	3 (6)	27 Aug 1911	Judaens AC, St George's, London, England, UK	
62	Win	47–9–6	Tom Perkins	PTS	10	16 Aug 1911	Judaens AC, St George's, London, England, UK	
61	Win	46–9–6	Curley Hume	PTS	6	13 Aug 1911	Judaens AC, St George's, London, England, UK	
60	Win	45–9–6	George Marks	PTS	6	23 Jul 1911	Judaens AC, St George's, London, England, UK	
59	Win	44–9–6	Dick Murray	PTS	6	18 Jun 1911	Judaens AC, St George's, London, England, UK	
58	Win	43–9–6	Alf Small	KO	12 (12)	11 Jun 1911	Judaens AC, St George's, London, England, UK	
57	Win	42–9–6	Dick Murray	PTS	6	7 Jun 1911	Judaens AC, St George's, London, England, UK	
56	Win	41–9–6	Young Klein	KO	3 (6)	4 Jun 1911	Judaens AC, St George's, London, England, UK	
55	Win	40–9–6	Sid Venner	PTS	6	1 Jun 1911	Judaens AC, St George's, London, England, UK	
54	Win	39–9–6	Jack English	TKO	3 (6)	24 May 1911	Judaens AC, St George's, London, England, UK	
53	Draw	38–9–6	Jack Kid Greenstock	PTS	6	21 May 1911	Judaens AC, St George's, London, England, UK	
52	Win	38–9–5	Alf Small	PTS	10	14 May 1911	Judaens AC, St George's, London, England, UK	
51	Win	37–9–5	Joe Madden	PTS	12	5 May 1911	Judaens AC, St George's, London, England, UK	
50	Loss	36–9–5	Nat Young Brooks	PTS	15	30 Apr 1911	Judaens AC, St George's, London, England, UK	
49	Win	36–8–5	Young Jack Chinney	PTS	6	27 Apr 1911	The Chelsea Club, Fulham, London, England, UK	
48	Win	35–8–5	Young Hyams	PTS	6	24 Apr 1911	The Ring, Blackfriars Road, Southwark, London, England, UK	
47	Win	34–8–5	Private Jack Marks	TKO	7 (10)	23 Apr 1911	Judaens AC, St George's, London, England, UK	
46	Loss	33–8–5	Jack Fisher	PTS	6	23 Apr 1911	Poplar, London, England, UK	
45	Win	33–7–5	Nat Young Brooks	PTS	6	9 Apr 1911	Judaens AC, St George's, London, England, UK	
44	Win	32–7–5	Jack Guyon	TKO	3 (3)	5 Apr 1911	Judaens AC, St George's, London, England, UK	
43	Win	31–7–5	Young Joe Ross	PTS	3	5 Apr 1911	Judaens AC, St George's, London, England, UK	
42	Win	30–7–5	Charlie Young Smith	KO	4 (6)	29 Mar 1911	Judaens AC, St George's, London, England, UK	
41	Win	29–7–5	Jim Butler	KO	1 (6)	5 Mar 1911	Judaens AC, St George's, London, England, UK	
40	Win	28–7–5	Kid Levene	PTS	6	20 Feb 1911	The Ring, Blackfriars Road, Southwark, London, England, UK	
39	Draw	27–7–5	Joe Madden	PTS	6	19 Feb 1911	Judaens AC, St George's, London, England, UK	
38	Loss	27–7–4	Young Sullivan	PTS	6	12 Feb 1911	Judaens AC, St George's, London, England, UK	
37	Win	27–6–4	Billy Smith	KO	4 (6)	9 Feb 1911	Judaens AC, St George's, London, England, UK	
36	Win	26–6–4	Alf Small	TKO	2 (6)	5 Feb 1911	Judaens AC, St George's, London, England, UK	
35	Win	25–6–4	Young Klein	KO	3 (6)	1 Feb 1911	Judaens AC, St George's, London, England, UK	
34	Win	24–6–4	Joe Jacobs	PTS	6	29 Jan 1911	Judaens AC, St George's, London, England, UK	
33	Win	23–6–4	Joe Madden	PTS	6	25 Jan 1911	Olympia Annexe, Kensington, London, England, UK	
32	Win	22–6–4	Alf Jacobs	PTS	6	22 Jan 1911	Judaens AC, St George's, London, England, UK	
31	Win	21–6–4	Private Jack Marks	PTS	6	15 Jan 1911	Judaens AC, St George's, London, England, UK	
30	Win	20–6–4	Bill Marsh	PTS	6	8 Jan 1911	Judaens AC, St George's, London, England, UK	
29	Loss	19–6–4	Hugh Doyle	KO	3 (15)	21 Nov 1910	International Hall, Liverpool, Merseyside, England, UK	
28	Win	19–5–4	Boyo Lambert	PTS	6	13 Nov 1910	Judaens AC, St George's, London, England, UK	
27	Win	18–5–4	Curley Bume	PTS	6	9 Oct 1910	Judaens AC, St George's, London, England, UK	
26	Win	17–5–4	Sid Venner	PTS	6	16 Aug 1910	Judaens AC, St George's, London, England, UK	
25	Win	16–5–4	Young Smith	TKO	3 (6)	14 Aug 1910	Judaens AC, St George's, London, England, UK	
24	Win	15–5–4	Ted O'Neil	KO	5 (6)	7 Aug 1910	Judaens AC, St George's, London, England, UK	
23	Draw	14–5–4	Joe Madden	PTS	6	31 Jul 1910	Judaens AC, St George's, London, England, UK	
22	Draw	14–5–3	Jack Kid Greenstock	PTS	6	25 Jul 1910	Judaens AC, St George's, London, England, UK	
21	Win	14–5–2	Alf Jacobs	PTS	6	24 Jul 1910	Judaens AC, St George's, London, England, UK	
20	Draw	13–5–2	Jack Kid Greenstock	PTS	6	17 Jul 1910	Judaens AC, St George's, London, England, UK	
19	Win	13–5–1	Joe Madden	RTD	3 (6)	5 Jun 1910	Judaens AC, St George's, London, England, UK	
18	Win	12–5–1	Young Sullivan	PTS	6	29 May 1910	Judaens AC, St George's, London, England, UK	
17	Win	11–5–1	Young Jack Morris	PTS	6	22 May 1910	Judaens AC, St George's, London, England, UK	
16	Win	10–5–1	Kid Levene	PTS	6	15 May 1910	Judaens AC, St George's, London, England, UK	
15	Win	9–5–1	Private Jack Marks	PTS	6	28 Feb 1910	Judaens AC, St George's, London, England, UK	
14	Win	8–5–1	Piper Holmes	PTS	6	27 Feb 1910	Judaens AC, St George's, London, England, UK	
13	Win	7–5–1	George Powell	RTD	1 (6)	13 Feb 1910	Judaens AC, St George's, London, England, UK	
12	Loss	6–5–1	Boyo Lambert	PTS	6	5 Feb 1910	Winter Gardens, Peckham, London, England, UK	
11	Loss	6–4–1	Jim Brown	PTS	6	29 Jan 1910	Hippodrome, Peckham, London, England, UK	
10	Win	6–3–1	Alf Jacobs	PTS	6	16 Jan 1910	Judaens AC, St George's, London, England, UK	
9	Win	5–3–1	Bill Marsh	PTS	6	8 Jan 1910	Hippodrome, Peckham, London, England, UK	
8	Win	4–3–1	Kid Levene	TKO	3 (6)	19 Dec 1909	Judaens AC, St George's, London, England, UK	
7	Draw	3–3–1	Dick Hart	PTS	6	5 Dec 1909	Judaens AC, St George's, London, England, UK	
6	Win	3–3	Private Jack Marks	PTS	6	27 Nov 1909	Surrey Music Hall, Southwark, London, England, UK	
5	Loss	2–3	George Thomas	TKO	1 (3)	30 Oct 1909	Saddlers Wells Theatre, Clerkenwell, London, England, UK	
4	Win	2–2	Alf Cohen	PTS	6	9 Oct 1909	Judaeans AC, St George's, London, England, UK	
3	Win	1–2	Young Lipton	PTS	6	19 Sep 1909	Judaeans AC, St George's, London, England, UK	
2	Loss	0–2	Johnny Sharp	PTS	6	12 Sep 1909	Judaeans AC, St George's, London, England, UK	
1	Loss	0–1	Kid Da Costa	PTS	6	29 Aug 1909	Judaeans AC, St George's, London, England, UK	

== See also ==
- List of welterweight boxing champions
- List of select Jewish boxers
- List of British Jewish sportspeople

Achievements
Preceded by Jack Britton	World Welterweight Champion; 31 August 1915 – 24 April 1916	Succeeded by Jack Britton
Preceded by Jack Britton	World Welterweight Champion; 25 June 1917 – 17 March 1919	Succeeded by Jack Britton
