= Hunts Point Palace =

Former ballroom in the Bronx, New York

- Interactive map of Hunts Point Palace
- Full name: Hunts Point Palace
- Address: 953 Southern Boulevard; Bronx, New York; United States
- Coordinates: 40°49′18″N 73°53′32″W
- Capacity: 2,500 (ballroom)
- Type: Ballroom; Indoor arena

Construction
- Opened: 1913
- Closed: 1989
- Cost: $450,000
- Architect: James F. Meehan

The Hunts Point Palace (also referred to as the Hunts Point Ballroom) was a ballroom located at 953 Southern Boulevard in the Hunts Point neighborhood of the Bronx, New York City.

== History ==
The Hunts Point Palace was built in 1913 by James F. Meehan, an architect and builder closely associated with the early development of Hunts Point. It was situated at 953 Southern Boulevard in the Bronx, New York City.

The building was a five-story structure built at an estimated cost of $450,000, fronting 140 feet on Southern Boulevard and the Hunts Point square, extending 150 feet in depth, with a right of way to 163rd Street. It contained lodge and meeting rooms, salon and banquet halls, and a 140 by 140 foot ballroom described as the largest of its kind in New York City. The Hunt's Point Palace stood next to the Cecil Spooner Theatre. The location could be reached via Bronx trolley lines, and the Simpson Street subway station stood one block away.

The Hunts Point Palace, completed as part of James F. Meehan's $1,000,000 community building at Southern Boulevard and 163rd Street, was leased long-term to George Maguire and Edward Gilligan for $300,000.

By January 1919, Hunts Point Palace had become one of Greater New York's largest dance halls, with a capacity for more than 4,000 patrons. It was advertised as a "Mecca For Dancers." The venue allowed the one-step, two-step, foxtrot, tango, and waltz, but prohibited the shimmy.

The palace changed hands on February 17, 1919, when it was sold to Robert E. Simon, who had separated from the Henry Morgenthau Company after he had sold its holdings and begun operating independently.

=== Boxing ===
During its history, the Bronx ballroom was used as a boxing venue. The Hunts Point Sporting Club began operations at the Hunts Point Palace on September 5, 1916, under matchmaker Lew Meyers and manager Harry Mishkind. The inaugural boxing card at the Hunts Point Palace Athletic Club occurred on September 5, 1916, with Marty Cross vs. Jack Coyne as the headliner. The venue's final bout, between Ted "Kid" Lewis and Jimmy Coffey, was staged in April 1917 before New York's Frawley Law was repealed.

In 1921, with the Walker Law in effect, the property was leased for a two-year term for weekly boxing shows run by the Hunts Point Athletic Association, with Garry Gabriel serving as president, Lew Rose as secretary, and Samuel Drucker as treasurer. Boxing resumed at Hunts Point Palace on April 18, 1921, with programs running through January 1922.

=== Music ===
With the rising popularity of Mambo and Latin jazz music in New York City, Hunts Point Palace became a popular Latin American dance club in the 1950s. Notable performers include Tito Puente and Milton Cardona.

== Live performances ==
On November 23, 1958, the Jazz Art Society presented Alto Madness featuring Jackie McLean, Cannonball Adderley, Gigi Gryce, and Lou Donaldson. Wynton Kelly played piano, George Tucker played bass, and Charlie Persip played the drums. Other bands featured were the Bobby Capers and the Rocky Boyd Quintet.

Other notable live performances included:

- June 6, 1981: The Hell Raisin' Hip Hopp Hoedownn featuring Afrika Bambaataa & the Soulsonic Force

== Closure ==
The venue had closed by 1989.
