= Tom Gummer =

British boxer (1894–1982)

Personal information
- Nationality: British
- Born: Thomas Gummer; 1894 Rotherham, England
- Died: 1982 (aged 87−88) Rotherham, England
- Weight: Heavyweight, middleweight

Boxing career

Boxing record
- Total fights: 24
- Wins: 16
- Win by KO: 13
- Losses: 7
- Draws: 1

Thomas Gummer (1894–1982) was a British middleweight and heavyweight boxer who won the British middleweight title in 1920 and went on to fight for the European title.

== Career ==
Born in Rotherham in 1894, Tom Gummer served as a Private (and later Corporal and Sergeant) in the York and Lancaster Regiment of the British Army, and had his first professional fight in 1914. He won all of his fights (at least eleven) that year, and his first two of 1915, including a victory over former British heavyweight champion "Iron" Hague by knockout with three seconds of the final round remaining. A planned fight in July 1914 against David Cohen (a.k.a. Dick Simmonds) resulted in a court case after Cohen took payment for the fight but then disappeared after seeing Gummer and becoming "nervous and frightened". Gummer suffered his first defeat to Gus Platts in August 1915, at which time Gummer was a heavyweight and Platts a welterweight and over 2 stones lighter, and his second to Harry Curzon in November.

In 1919 he faced both Platts and Curzon again, and won both fights.

He got his first British title shot in March 1920 against Jim Sullivan after reigning champion Pat O'Keeffe retired from boxing; Gummer won after Sullivan retired in the 14th round. He followed this with a win over Bandsman Jack Blake and a draw with Herbert Crossley before fighting Ercole Balzac for the European middleweight title in Paris in December 1920; Gummer was knocked out in the ninth round.

He had a second shot at the European title in March 1921 against Gus Platts, a fight in which Gummer was also defending his British title; Gummer retired in the sixth round, losing his title.

Gummer's final fight was against Ted Kid Lewis in February 1922 at The Dome in Brighton; Intended as a fight for Lewis's British middleweight title, it was fought as a non-title catchweight bout after Gummer failed to make the weight; Lewis knocked Gummer out in the first round.

After retiring from boxing, Gummer played football for Rotherham Eastwood in the 1920s and worked as a boxing referee between the late 1920s and the 1940s.

Tom Gummer married Myra McMahon and they had four children together. He died in Rotherham in 1982.
