= Gus Platts =

British boxer

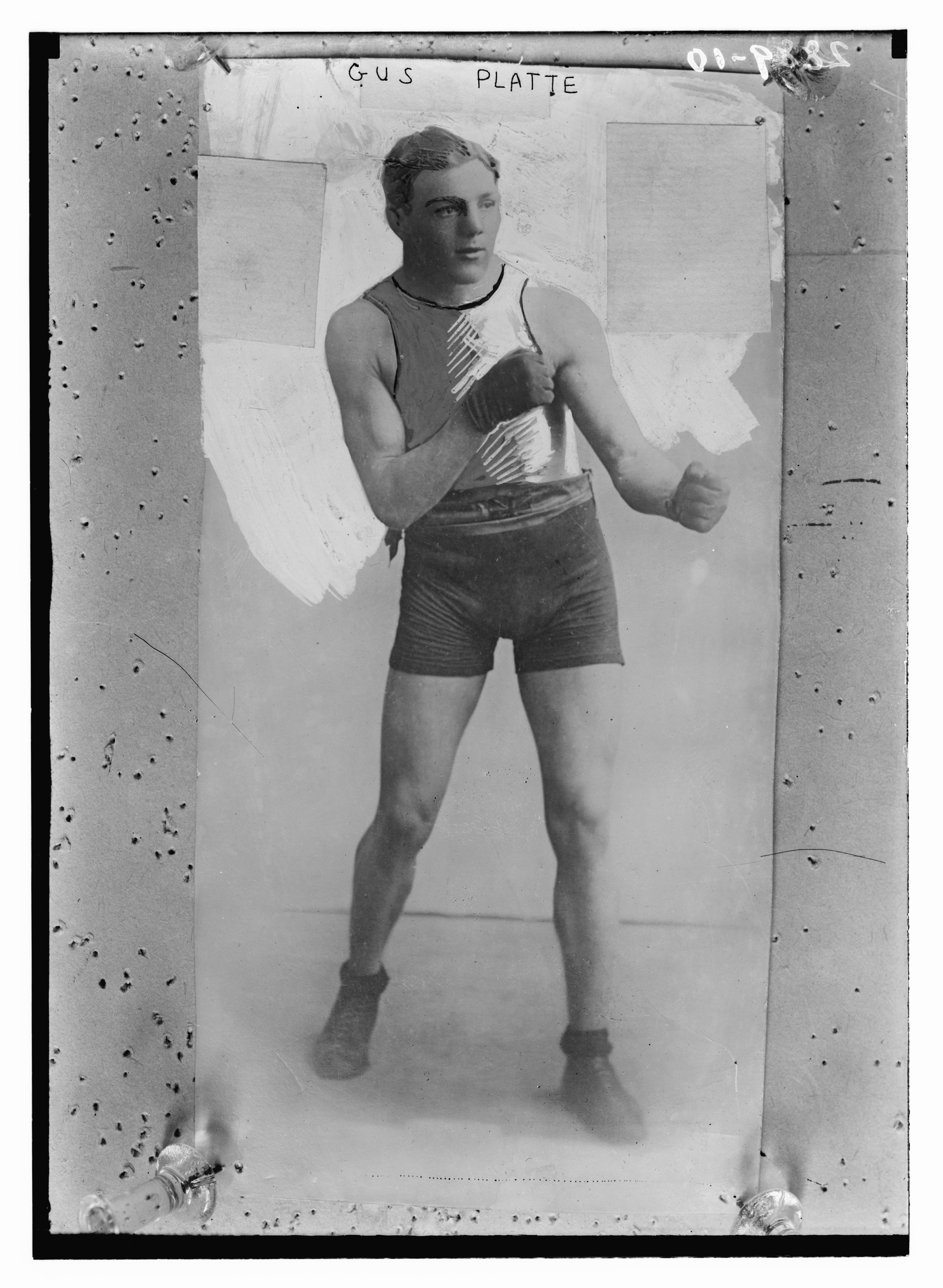

Personal information
- Nickname: The Sheffield Blade
- Nationality: British
- Born: Augustus T. Platts; 24 October 1891 Walkley, Sheffield, England
- Died: 4 December 1942 (aged 51) Nottingham, England
- Weight: Middleweight, welterweight

Boxing career

Training for boxers. George Cook, the Australian heavy weight fights with Frank Goddard. Boxers jump rope. Gus Platts will fight Johnny Basham. Duration: 0:36 minutes.

Augustus T. Platts (24 October 1891 – 4 December 1942) was a British boxer who was British and European middleweight champion.

== Career ==
Platts' first known fight was in 1910. His first defeat came in December that year to Kid Vinton. After building up an impressive record, he won the Yorkshire welterweight title in September 1911. In November that year he beat Johnny Basham on points. Undefeated in 1912, he lost in April 1913 to future World welterweight champion Tom McCormick. After a Summer fighting in the US, he fought McCormick again in September, this time winning a 20-round points decision. He travelled to Australia for a series of fights in early 1914. In May 1915 Platts, at the time a Private in the British Army was arrested after a match against Sergeant McCusker after absenting himself without leave to take part in the fight. In August 1915 he beat Tom Gummer and in December 1916 he drew with Basham. In November 1917 he beat Noel "Boy" McCormick after the latter broke a bone in his hand punching Platts.

Platts won the European middleweight title in February 1921, beating Ercole de Balzac in the 7th round. He defended the title successfully against Gummer a month later, taking the British title in the process. He lost both titles in May that year after losing to Johnny Basham on points at the Royal Albert Hall. He again made the trip to the US where he lost to Mike McTigue among others. He fought Balzac again in January 1922, this time losing to the Frenchman, and continued until May that year, his last fight a defeat to Rene DeVos in Antwerp.

Platts had a part in the 1922 film The Referee playing a boxer, credited as 'Gus Platz'.

He made a comeback to boxing in 1927, winning his first fight back against fellow veteran Harry Reeve. After a loss to Con O'Kelly and a win over Rocky Knight, his final fight was a loss to future British heavyweight contender Don Shortland on 7 March.

In a career of over 200 fights, Platts was never knocked out.

After retiring from boxing, Platts had a successful career as a wrestler, his first match being in April 1932. He went on to become a boxing manager and promoter, and also a referee.

Platts married Grace Gite and after retiring from boxing was a publican, running a public house in Petre Street in Sheffield, before moving to Nottingham where he ran the White Hart Inn in Glasshouse Street.

Gus Platts died on 4 December 1942 in a Nottingham hospital after a long illness; he was 51. His funeral was held at Wilford Hill.
