= Young Erne =

American boxer

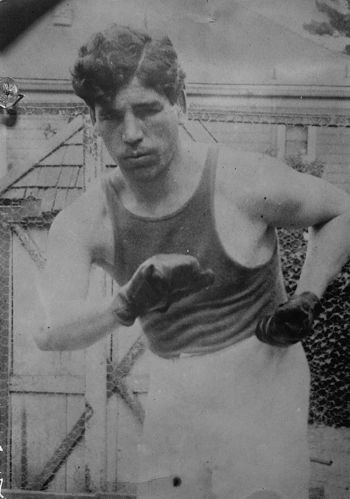

Personal information
- Nicknames: Yi Yi Erne, Hugh Clavin
- Born: Hugh Frank Clavin; March 17, 1884 Philadelphia, Pennsylvania, U.S.
- Died: February 29, 1944 (aged 59)
- Weight: Lightweight

Boxing career
- Stance: Orthodox

Boxing record
- Total fights: 274; with the inclusion of newspaper decisions
- Wins: 164
- Win by KO: 15
- Losses: 58
- Draws: 52

Young Erne (1884–1944) was an American boxer from Philadelphia, Pennsylvania. In his first 36 fights, he had a record of 28-2-6.

== Career ==
Despite never having fought for a world title, he held wins over champions and International Boxing Hall of Famers such as Harry Lewis, Young Corbett II, Abe Attell, George Lavigne, Jack Britton. While Erne is not enshrined into the International Boxing Hall of Fame, he was inducted into the Philadelphia Boxing Hall of Fame.

== Professional boxing record ==
All information in this section is derived from BoxRec, unless otherwise stated.

=== Official record ===
274 fights	24 wins	11 losses
By knockout	15	4
By decision	6	7
By disqualification	3	0
Draws	5	
Newspaper decisions/draws	234	

All newspaper decisions are officially regarded as "no decision" bouts and are not counted in the win/loss/draw column.

No.	Result	Record	Opponent	Type	Round(s)	Date	Age	Location
274	Loss	24–11–5 (234)	Steve Latzo	KO	5 (10)	Oct 22, 1917	33 years, 219 days	Maennerchor Hall, Hazleton, Pennsylvania, U.S.
273	Loss	24–10–5 (234)	Milburn Saylor	NWS	6	Jun 11, 1917	33 years, 86 days	Broadway A.C., Philadelphia, Pennsylvania, U.S.
272	Win	24–10–5 (233)	George "Kid" Alberts	NWS	6	May 3, 1917	33 years, 47 days	Auditorium, Reading, Pennsylvania, U.S.
271	Draw	24–10–5 (232)	Mickey Sheridan	NWS	6	Oct 13, 1916	32 years, 210 days	Lincoln A.C., Philadelphia, Pennsylvania, U.S.
270	Win	24–10–5 (231)	Henry Hauber	NWS	6	Sep 7, 1916	32 years, 174 days	Broadway A.C., Philadelphia, Pennsylvania, U.S.
269	Draw	24–10–5 (230)	Henry Hauber	NWS	6	Aug 7, 1916	32 years, 143 days	Broadway A.C., Philadelphia, Pennsylvania, U.S.
268	Loss	24–10–5 (229)	Young Jack O'Brien	NWS	6	Jun 23, 1916	32 years, 98 days	Lincoln A.C., Philadelphia, Pennsylvania, U.S.
267	Win	24–10–5 (228)	Ritz Walters	NWS	6	May 26, 1916	32 years, 70 days	Lincoln A.C., Philadelphia, Pennsylvania, U.S.
266	Loss	24–10–5 (227)	Mike O'Dowd	NWS	6	Mar 18, 1916	32 years, 1 day	National A.C., Philadelphia, Pennsylvania, U.S.
265	Loss	24–10–5 (226)	"Young" Tommy Coleman	NWS	6	Mar 6, 1915	30 years, 354 days	National A.C., Philadelphia, Pennsylvania, U.S.
264	Loss	24–10–5 (225)	"Young" Tommy Coleman	NWS	6	Jan 29, 1915	30 years, 318 days	Quaker City A.C., Philadelphia, Pennsylvania, U.S.
263	Loss	24–10–5 (224)	Al Thiel	NWS	6	Nov 7, 1914	30 years, 235 days	National A.C., Philadelphia, Pennsylvania, U.S.
262	Draw	24–10–5 (223)	Jack Toland	NWS	6	May 28, 1914	30 years, 72 days	Broadway A.C., Philadelphia, Pennsylvania, U.S.
261	Loss	24–10–5 (222)	Italian Joe Gans	NWS	6	Mar 28, 1914	30 years, 11 days	National A.C., Philadelphia, Pennsylvania, U.S.
260	Win	24–10–5 (221)	Bert Stanley	NWS	6	Nov 22, 1913	29 years, 250 days	National A.C., Philadelphia, Pennsylvania, U.S.
259	Draw	24–10–5 (220)	Frank Lynn	NWS	6	Nov 19, 1913	29 years, 247 days	Windsor, Ontario, Canada
258	Draw	24–10–5 (219)	Tommy Howell	NWS	6	Oct 20, 1913	29 years, 217 days	Olympia A.C., Philadelphia, Pennsylvania, U.S.
257	Draw	24–10–5 (218)	Joe Hirst	NWS	6	Sep 1, 1913	29 years, 168 days	Olympia A.C., Philadelphia, Pennsylvania, U.S.
256	Loss	24–10–5 (217)	Marcel Thomas	NWS	6	Jul 4, 1913	29 years, 109 days	Point Breeze Velodrome, Philadelphia, Pennsylvania, U.S.
255	Loss	24–10–5 (216)	Phil Cross	NWS	6	May 5, 1913	29 years, 49 days	Olympia A.C., Philadelphia, Pennsylvania, U.S.
254	Loss	24–10–5 (215)	Perry "Kid" Graves	NWS	6	Apr 19, 1913	29 years, 33 days	National A.C., Philadelphia, Pennsylvania, U.S.
253	Draw	24–10–5 (214)	Tommy Howell	NWS	6	Apr 5, 1913	29 years, 19 days	National A.C., Philadelphia, Pennsylvania, U.S.
252	Draw	24–10–5 (213)	Tommy Howell	NWS	6	Feb 17, 1913	28 years, 337 days	Olympia A.C., Philadelphia, Pennsylvania, U.S.
251	Win	24–10–5 (212)	Tommy Howell	NWS	6	Feb 3, 1913	28 years, 323 days	Olympia A.C., Philadelphia, Pennsylvania, U.S.
250	Draw	24–10–5 (211)	Eddie Shevlin	NWS	6	Jan 11, 1913	28 years, 300 days	National A.C., Philadelphia, Pennsylvania, U.S.
249	Win	24–10–5 (210)	Jack Fink	NWS	6	Dec 12, 1912	28 years, 270 days	Broadway A.C., Philadelphia, Pennsylvania, U.S.
248	Loss	24–10–5 (209)	"Young" Tommy Coleman	NWS	6	Dec 6, 1912	28 years, 264 days	Nonpareil A.C., Philadelphia, Pennsylvania, U.S.
247	Loss	24–10–5 (208)	Al McCoy	NWS	6	Nov 9, 1912	28 years, 237 days	National A.C., Philadelphia, Pennsylvania, U.S.
246	Loss	24–10–5 (207)	Red Robinson	NWS	6	Oct 5, 1912	28 years, 202 days	National A.C., Philadelphia, Pennsylvania, U.S.
245	Loss	24–10–5 (206)	Packey McFarland	NWS	6	May 15, 1912	28 years, 59 days	National A.C., Philadelphia, Pennsylvania, U.S.
244	Loss	24–10–5 (205)	Valentine K.O. Brown	NWS	10	Apr 15, 1912	28 years, 29 days	Madison A.C., New York City, New York, U.S.
243	Win	24–10–5 (204)	Young Jack O'Brien	NWS	6	Mar 29, 1912	28 years, 12 days	American A.C., Philadelphia, Pennsylvania, U.S.
242	Loss	24–10–5 (203)	Valentine K.O. Brown	NWS	6	Mar 13, 1912	27 years, 362 days	National A.C., Philadelphia, Pennsylvania, U.S.
241	Win	24–10–5 (202)	Jack Ward	NWS	6	Mar 2, 1912	27 years, 351 days	National A.C., Philadelphia, Pennsylvania, U.S.
240	Loss	24–10–5 (201)	Ray Bronson	NWS	10	Feb 22, 1912	27 years, 342 days	Auditorium, Indianapolis, Indiana, U.S.
239	Loss	24–10–5 (200)	Willie Ritchie	NWS	6	Feb 7, 1912	27 years, 327 days	National A.C., Philadelphia, Pennsylvania, U.S.
238	Win	24–10–5 (199)	Tommy Furey	PTS	15	Jan 16, 1912	27 years, 305 days	Thornton, New Jersey, U.S.
237	Win	23–10–5 (199)	Tommy Howell	NWS	6	Jan 13, 1912	27 years, 302 days	National A.C., Philadelphia, Pennsylvania, U.S.
236	Draw	23–10–5 (198)	Mike Gibbons	NWS	6	Dec 16, 1911	27 years, 274 days	National A.C., Philadelphia, Pennsylvania, U.S.
235	Win	23–10–5 (197)	Willie Moody	NWS	6	Dec 8, 1911	27 years, 266 days	Nonpareil A.C., Philadelphia, Pennsylvania, U.S.
234	Win	23–10–5 (196)	George Ashe	NWS	6	Dec 7, 1911	27 years, 265 days	Broadway A.C., Philadelphia, Pennsylvania, U.S.
233	Win	23–10–5 (195)	Frank Loughrey	NWS	6	Dec 4, 1911	27 years, 262 days	American A.C., Philadelphia, Pennsylvania, U.S.
232	Win	23–10–5 (194)	"Young" John McCartney	NWS	6	Nov 25, 1911	27 years, 253 days	National A.C., Philadelphia, Pennsylvania, U.S.
231	Win	23–10–5 (193)	"Young" Joe Griffo	NWS	6	Nov 23, 1911	27 years, 251 days	Broadway A.C., Philadelphia, Pennsylvania, U.S.
230	Loss	23–10–5 (192)	Joe Sieger	NWS	6	Nov 21, 1911	27 years, 249 days	Douglas A.C., Philadelphia, Pennsylvania, U.S.
229	Win	23–10–5 (191)	Cy Smith	NWS	6	Nov 20, 1911	27 years, 248 days	American A.C., Philadelphia, Pennsylvania, U.S.
228	Win	23–10–5 (190)	"Young" Kid Broad	NWS	6	Nov 2, 1911	27 years, 230 days	Broadway A.C., Philadelphia, Pennsylvania, U.S.
227	Win	23–10–5 (189)	"Young" Tommy Coleman	NWS	6	Oct 27, 1911	27 years, 224 days	National A.C., Philadelphia, Pennsylvania, U.S.
226	Win	23–10–5 (188)	Jimmy Perry	NWS	6	Oct 14, 1911	27 years, 211 days	National A.C., Philadelphia, Pennsylvania, U.S.
225	Win	23–10–5 (187)	Battling Mauldin	NWS	6	Oct 12, 1911	27 years, 209 days	Broadway A.C., Philadelphia, Pennsylvania, U.S.
224	Win	23–10–5 (186)	Johnny Willetts	NWS	6	Sep 21, 1911	27 years, 188 days	Broadway A.C., Philadelphia, Pennsylvania, U.S.
223	Win	23–10–5 (185)	Eddie Palmer	NWS	6	Sep 19, 1911	27 years, 186 days	Douglas A.C., Philadelphia, Pennsylvania, U.S.
222	Loss	23–10–5 (184)	"Young" Tommy Coleman	NWS	6	Sep 15, 1911	27 years, 182 days	Nonpareil A.C., Philadelphia, Pennsylvania, U.S.
221	Win	23–10–5 (183)	Johnny Krause	NWS	6	Sep 1, 1911	27 years, 168 days	Nonpareil A.C., Philadelphia, Pennsylvania, U.S.
220	Loss	23–10–5 (182)	Tommy Howell	NWS	6	Aug 15, 1911	27 years, 151 days	Douglas A.C., Philadelphia, Pennsylvania, U.S.
219	Draw	23–10–5 (181)	Barney Ford	NWS	6	Aug 10, 1911	27 years, 146 days	Broadway A.C., Philadelphia, Pennsylvania, U.S.
218	Draw	23–10–5 (180)	Barney Ford	PTS	6	Jul 27, 1911	27 years, 132 days	Broadway A.C., Philadelphia, Pennsylvania, U.S.
217	Win	23–10–4 (180)	Johnny Krause	NWS	6	Jul 6, 1911	27 years, 111 days	Broadway A.C., Philadelphia, Pennsylvania, U.S.
216	Win	23–10–4 (179)	Jimmy Fryer	NWS	6	Jun 29, 1911	27 years, 104 days	Broadway A.C., Philadelphia, Pennsylvania, U.S.
215	Win	23–10–4 (178)	Young Ahearn	NWS	6	May 22, 1911	27 years, 66 days	American A.C., Philadelphia, Pennsylvania, U.S.
214	Loss	23–10–4 (177)	Johnny Glover	NWS	6	Apr 24, 1911	27 years, 38 days	American A.C., Philadelphia, Pennsylvania, U.S.
213	Win	23–10–4 (176)	"Young" William Nitchie	NWS	6	Apr 18, 1911	27 years, 32 days	Douglas A.C., Philadelphia, Pennsylvania, U.S.
212	Win	23–10–4 (175)	Joe Heffernan	NWS	6	Mar 27, 1911	27 years, 10 days	American A.C., Philadelphia, Pennsylvania, U.S.
211	Win	23–10–4 (174)	"Young" William Nitchie	NWS	6	Mar 14, 1911	26 years, 362 days	Douglas A.C., Philadelphia, Pennsylvania, U.S.
210	Loss	23–10–4 (173)	Mike Glover	NWS	6	Mar 4, 1911	26 years, 352 days	American A.C., Philadelphia, Pennsylvania, U.S.
209	Loss	23–10–4 (172)	Packey McFarland	NWS	6	Jan 25, 1911	26 years, 314 days	National A.C., Philadelphia, Pennsylvania, U.S.
208	Win	23–10–4 (171)	Billy Willis	NWS	6	Jan 2, 1911	26 years, 291 days	American A.C., Philadelphia, Pennsylvania, U.S.
207	Win	23–10–4 (170)	Young Kid Broad	NWS	6	Nov 29, 1910	26 years, 257 days	Douglas A.C., Philadelphia, Pennsylvania, U.S.
206	Draw	23–10–4 (169)	Johnny Krause	NWS	6	Nov 18, 1910	26 years, 246 days	Central A.C., Philadelphia, Pennsylvania, U.S.
205	Win	23–10–4 (168)	Sammy Smith	NWS	6	Nov 12, 1910	26 years, 240 days	National A.C., Philadelphia, Pennsylvania, U.S.
204	Draw	23–10–4 (167)	Young Kid Broad	NWS	3	Nov 8, 1910	26 years, 236 days	Douglas A.C., Philadelphia, Pennsylvania, U.S.
203	Win	23–10–4 (166)	Charley "Twin" Miller	NWS	3	Nov 8, 1910	26 years, 236 days	Douglas A.C., Philadelphia, Pennsylvania, U.S.
202	Loss	23–10–4 (165)	Sammy Smith	NWS	6	Nov 5, 1910	26 years, 233 days	National A.C., Philadelphia, Pennsylvania, U.S.
201	Win	23–10–4 (164)	Joe Hirst	TKO	6 (6)	Oct 22, 1910	26 years, 219 days	National A.C., Philadelphia, Pennsylvania, U.S.
200	Win	22–10–4 (164)	Tommy Howell	NWS	6	Oct 18, 1910	26 years, 215 days	Douglas A.C., Philadelphia, Pennsylvania, U.S.
199	Win	22–10–4 (163)	Tommy Howell	DQ	6 (6)	Oct 4, 1910	26 years, 201 days	Douglas A.C., Philadelphia, Pennsylvania, U.S.
198	Win	21–10–4 (163)	Billy Donovan	NWS	6	Jul 18, 1910	26 years, 123 days	Lehigh A.C., Philadelphia, Pennsylvania, U.S.
197	Win	21–10–4 (162)	"Young" Sammy Smith	NWS	6	Jul 14, 1910	26 years, 119 days	Broadway A.C., Philadelphia, Pennsylvania, U.S.
196	Win	21–10–4 (161)	"Young" William Nitchie	NWS	6	Jul 12, 1910	26 years, 117 days	Douglas A.C., Philadelphia, Pennsylvania, U.S.
195	Win	21–10–4 (160)	Billy Willis	NWS	6	Jun 21, 1910	26 years, 96 days	Douglas A.C., Philadelphia, Pennsylvania, U.S.
194	Win	21–10–4 (159)	"Young" James Smedley	KO	3 (6)	Jun 14, 1910	26 years, 89 days	Douglas A.C., Philadelphia, Pennsylvania, U.S.
193	Win	20–10–4 (159)	Billy Willis	NWS	6	Jun 7, 1910	26 years, 82 days	Douglas A.C., Philadelphia, Pennsylvania, U.S.
192	Win	20–10–4 (158)	Tommy O'Keefe	KO	2 (6)	May 28, 1910	26 years, 72 days	Broadway A.C., Philadelphia, Pennsylvania, U.S.
191	Win	19–10–4 (158)	Tommy Stone	NWS	6	May 16, 1910	26 years, 60 days	Armory, Harrisburg, Pennsylvania, U.S.
190	Loss	19–10–4 (157)	Leo Houck	NWS	6	Apr 15, 1910	26 years, 29 days	Douglas A.C., Philadelphia, Pennsylvania, U.S.
189	Loss	19–10–4 (156)	Leo Houck	NWS	6	Mar 31, 1910	26 years, 14 days	Lancaster A.C., Lancaster, Pennsylvania, U.S.
188	Win	19–10–4 (155)	Willie Fitzgerald	NWS	6	Mar 26, 1910	26 years, 9 days	National A.C., Philadelphia, Pennsylvania, U.S.
187	Win	19–10–4 (154)	Mickey Gannon	NWS	6	Mar 5, 1910	25 years, 353 days	National A.C., Philadelphia, Pennsylvania, U.S.
186	Win	19–10–4 (153)	Jack Britton	NWS	6	Feb 22, 1910	25 years, 342 days	Douglas A.C., Philadelphia, Pennsylvania, U.S.
185	Draw	19–10–4 (152)	Leo Houck	NWS	6	Feb 12, 1910	25 years, 332 days	National A.C., Philadelphia, Pennsylvania, U.S.
184	Win	19–10–4 (151)	Billy Willis	NWS	6	Feb 1, 1910	25 years, 321 days	Douglas A.C., Philadelphia, Pennsylvania, U.S.
183	Win	19–10–4 (150)	Fred Corbett	NWS	6	Jan 22, 1910	25 years, 311 days	National A.C., Philadelphia, Pennsylvania, U.S.
182	Win	19–10–4 (149)	Joe Hirst	NWS	6	Jan 18, 1910	25 years, 307 days	Douglas A.C., Philadelphia, Pennsylvania, U.S.
181	Win	19–10–4 (148)	Willie Lucas	NWS	6	Dec 21, 1909	25 years, 279 days	Douglas A.C., Philadelphia, Pennsylvania, U.S.
180	Win	19–10–4 (147)	"Young" William Nitchie	NWS	6	Dec 11, 1909	25 years, 269 days	National A.C., Philadelphia, Pennsylvania, U.S.
179	Win	19–10–4 (146)	Harlem Tommy Murphy	NWS	6	Nov 20, 1909	25 years, 248 days	National A.C., Philadelphia, Pennsylvania, U.S.
178	Win	19–10–4 (145)	Johnny Willetts	NWS	6	Nov 13, 1909	25 years, 241 days	National A.C., Philadelphia, Pennsylvania, U.S.
177	Win	19–10–4 (144)	Johnny Willetts	NWS	6	Oct 26, 1909	25 years, 223 days	Douglas A.C., Philadelphia, Pennsylvania, U.S.
176	Loss	19–10–4 (143)	Joe Hirst	NWS	6	Oct 7, 1909	25 years, 204 days	Broadway A.C., Philadelphia, Pennsylvania, U.S.
175	Win	19–10–4 (142)	Joe Hirst	NWS	6	Sep 29, 1909	25 years, 196 days	New Philadelphia A.C., Philadelphia, Pennsylvania, U.S.
174	Win	19–10–4 (141)	Fred Corbett	NWS	6	Sep 27, 1909	25 years, 194 days	West End A.C., Philadelphia, Pennsylvania, U.S.
173	Draw	19–10–4 (140)	Tommy O'Keefe	NWS	6	Sep 23, 1909	25 years, 190 days	Broadway A.C., Philadelphia, Pennsylvania, U.S.
172	Draw	19–10–4 (139)	Willie Lucas	NWS	6	Sep 10, 1909	25 years, 177 days	Nonpareil A.C., Philadelphia, Pennsylvania, U.S.
171	Draw	19–10–4 (138)	Fred Corbett	NWS	6	Sep 8, 1909	25 years, 175 days	New Philadelphia A.C., Philadelphia, Pennsylvania, U.S.
170	Win	19–10–4 (137)	Kid Locke	NWS	6	Sep 2, 1909	25 years, 169 days	Broadway A.C., Philadelphia, Pennsylvania, U.S.
169	Loss	19–10–4 (136)	Lew Powell	PTS	20	Jun 25, 1909	25 years, 100 days	Dreamland Rink, San Francisco, California, U.S.
168	Loss	19–9–4 (136)	Leach Cross	NWS	10	May 28, 1909	25 years, 72 days	Fairmont A.C., New York City, New York, U.S.
167	Loss	19–9–4 (135)	Freddie Welsh	PTS	20	Feb 20, 1909	24 years, 340 days	New Orleans, Louisiana, U.S.
166	Win	19–8–4 (135)	Mickey Gannon	NWS	6	Jan 11, 1909	24 years, 300 days	Washington S.C., Philadelphia, Pennsylvania, U.S.
165	Win	19–8–4 (134)	Leach Cross	NWS	6	Jan 4, 1909	24 years, 293 days	Washington S.C., Philadelphia, Pennsylvania, U.S.
164	Loss	19–8–4 (133)	Tommy Quill	PTS	12	Dec 1, 1908	24 years, 259 days	Armory A.A., Boston, Massachusetts, U.S.
163	Win	19–7–4 (133)	Eddie Murphy	NWS	12	Nov 17, 1908	24 years, 245 days	Armory A.A., Boston, Massachusetts, U.S.
162	Win	19–7–4 (132)	Billy Glover	NWS	6	Oct 29, 1908	24 years, 226 days	Broadway A.C., Philadelphia, Pennsylvania, U.S.
161	Loss	19–7–4 (131)	Young Otto	NWS	6	Oct 26, 1908	24 years, 223 days	Roman A.C., New York City, New York, U.S.
160	Loss	19–7–4 (130)	Young Loughrey	NWS	6	Oct 19, 1908	24 years, 216 days	State A.C., Philadelphia, Pennsylvania, U.S.
159	Loss	19–7–4 (129)	Willie Moody	NWS	6	Sep 7, 1908	24 years, 174 days	State A.C., Philadelphia, Pennsylvania, U.S.
158	Loss	19–7–4 (128)	Tommy Quill	PTS	12	Jun 30, 1908	24 years, 105 days	Armory A.A., Boston, Massachusetts, U.S.
157	Draw	19–6–4 (128)	Tommy Quill	PTS	12	May 26, 1908	24 years, 70 days	Armory A.A., Boston, Massachusetts, U.S.
156	Win	19–6–3 (128)	Harlem Tommy Murphy	NWS	6	Apr 11, 1908	24 years, 25 days	National A.C., Philadelphia, Pennsylvania, U.S.
155	Draw	19–6–3 (127)	Johnny Marto	NWS	6	Mar 25, 1908	24 years, 8 days	Sharkey A.C., New York City, New York, U.S.
154	Draw	19–6–3 (126)	Young Loughrey	NWS	6	Jan 11, 1908	23 years, 300 days	National A.C., Philadelphia, Pennsylvania, U.S.
153	Win	19–6–3 (125)	Joe Galligan	KO	5 (6)	Dec 25, 1907	23 years, 283 days	National A.C., Philadelphia, Pennsylvania, U.S.
152	Win	18–6–3 (125)	Willie Moody	NWS	6	Dec 14, 1907	23 years, 272 days	National A.C., Philadelphia, Pennsylvania, U.S.
151	Loss	18–6–3 (124)	Eddie Chambers	NWS	6	Nov 4, 1907	23 years, 232 days	Spring Garden A.C., Philadelphia, Pennsylvania, U.S.
150	Draw	18–6–3 (123)	"Young" Frank Kenny	NWS	6	Oct 12, 1907	23 years, 209 days	National A.C., Philadelphia, Pennsylvania, U.S.
149	Draw	18–6–3 (122)	Young French	PTS	6	Oct 9, 1907	23 years, 206 days	Elmira, New York, U.S.
148	Loss	18–6–2 (122)	Tommy Quill	NWS	6	Sep 21, 1907	23 years, 188 days	National A.C., Philadelphia, Pennsylvania, U.S.
147	Win	18–6–2 (121)	Johnny Summers	NWS	6	Jun 19, 1907	23 years, 94 days	National A.C., Philadelphia, Pennsylvania, U.S.
146	Win	18–6–2 (120)	"Young" Thomas Kloby	NWS	6	May 11, 1907	23 years, 55 days	National A.C., Philadelphia, Pennsylvania, U.S.
145	Win	18–6–2 (119)	Young Corbett II	NWS	6	Apr 27, 1907	23 years, 41 days	National A.C., Philadelphia, Pennsylvania, U.S.
144	Draw	18–6–2 (118)	Tom Prendergast	NWS	6	Apr 24, 1907	23 years, 38 days	Detroit, Michigan, U.S.
143	Win	18–6–2 (117)	Spike Robson	NWS	6	Mar 16, 1907	22 years, 364 days	National A.C., Philadelphia, Pennsylvania, U.S.
142	Win	18–6–2 (116)	George "Kid" Lavigne	TKO	6 (6)	Jan 19, 1907	22 years, 308 days	National A.C., Philadelphia, Pennsylvania, U.S.
141	Win	17–6–2 (116)	Eddie Chambers	NWS	6	Dec 25, 1906	22 years, 283 days	National A.C., Philadelphia, Pennsylvania, U.S.
140	Draw	17–6–2 (115)	Unk Russell	NWS	6	Dec 15, 1906	22 years, 273 days	National A.C., Philadelphia, Pennsylvania, U.S.
139	Win	17–6–2 (114)	"Young" Frank Kelly	NWS	6	Nov 29, 1906	22 years, 257 days	National A.C., Philadelphia, Pennsylvania, U.S.
138	Draw	17–6–2 (113)	Unk Russell	NWS	6	Oct 27, 1906	22 years, 224 days	National A.C., Philadelphia, Pennsylvania, U.S.
137	Draw	17–6–2 (112)	Unk Russell	NWS	6	Oct 6, 1906	22 years, 203 days	National A.C., Philadelphia, Pennsylvania, U.S.
136	Loss	17–6–2 (111)	Dave Deshler	PTS	15	Sep 26, 1906	22 years, 193 days	Lincoln A.C., Chelsea, Pennsylvania, U.S.
135	Win	17–5–2 (111)	Jack Cardiff	PTS	10	Aug 24, 1906	22 years, 160 days	Reading, Pennsylvania, U.S.
134	Loss	16–5–2 (111)	Freddie Welsh	NWS	6	Jul 13, 1906	22 years, 118 days	National A.C., Philadelphia, Pennsylvania, U.S.
133	Draw	16–5–2 (110)	Hock Keys	NWS	6	May 21, 1906	22 years, 65 days	Washington S.C., Philadelphia, Pennsylvania, U.S.
132	Win	16–5–2 (109)	Dave Deshler	NWS	6	May 14, 1906	22 years, 58 days	Washington S.C., Philadelphia, Pennsylvania, U.S.
131	Win	16–5–2 (108)	Kid Sullivan	NWS	6	Apr 23, 1906	22 years, 37 days	Washington S.C., Philadelphia, Pennsylvania, U.S.
130	Draw	16–5–2 (107)	Billy Finucane	PTS	10	Mar 9, 1906	21 years, 357 days	Terre Haute, Indiana, U.S.
129	Win	16–5–1 (107)	Charley Sieger	NWS	6	Feb 26, 1906	21 years, 346 days	Washington S.C., Philadelphia, Pennsylvania, U.S.
128	Loss	16–5–1 (106)	Jimmy Gardner	TKO	5 (6)	Feb 5, 1906	21 years, 325 days	Washington S.C., Philadelphia, Pennsylvania, U.S.
127	Draw	16–4–1 (106)	Maurice Sayers	NWS	6	Jan 15, 1906	21 years, 304 days	Washington S.C., Philadelphia, Pennsylvania, U.S.
126	Win	16–4–1 (105)	Charley Sieger	NWS	3	Jan 13, 1906	21 years, 302 days	Metropolitan A.C., New York City, New York, U.S.
125	Draw	16–4–1 (104)	Jimmy Briggs	NWS	6	Jan 1, 1906	21 years, 290 days	National A.C., Philadelphia, Pennsylvania, U.S.
124	Win	16–4–1 (103)	Charles Neary	PTS	8	Dec 8, 1905	21 years, 266 days	Panorama Building, Milwaukee, Wisconsin, U.S.
123	Win	15–4–1 (103)	Jack O'Leary	NWS	8	Nov 17, 1905	21 years, 245 days	Panorama Building, Milwaukee, Wisconsin, U.S.
122	Win	15–4–1 (102)	Young Corbett II	NWS	6	Oct 25, 1905	21 years, 222 days	Washington S.C., Philadelphia, Pennsylvania, U.S.
121	Win	15–4–1 (101)	Abe Attell	NWS	6	Oct 4, 1905	21 years, 201 days	National A.C., Philadelphia, Pennsylvania, U.S.
120	Win	15–4–1 (100)	Harry Lewis	NWS	6	Sep 7, 1905	21 years, 174 days	Broadway A.C., Philadelphia, Pennsylvania, U.S.
119	Win	15–4–1 (99)	Tim Callahan	NWS	6	Aug 31, 1905	21 years, 167 days	Broadway A.C., Philadelphia, Pennsylvania, U.S.
118	Win	15–4–1 (98)	Jack O'Neil	NWS	6	Aug 17, 1905	21 years, 153 days	Broadway A.C., Philadelphia, Pennsylvania, U.S.
117	Win	15–4–1 (97)	Harry Lewis	PTS	15	Aug 7, 1905	21 years, 143 days	Leiperville, Pennsylvania, U.S.
116	Draw	14–4–1 (97)	Sammy Smith	NWS	6	Jul 27, 1905	21 years, 132 days	Broadway A.C., Philadelphia, Pennsylvania, U.S.
115	Win	14–4–1 (96)	Abraham "Kid" Goodman	NWS	6	Jul 10, 1905	21 years, 115 days	National A.C., Philadelphia, Pennsylvania, U.S.
114	Win	14–4–1 (95)	Harry Lewis	PTS	10	Jun 20, 1905	21 years, 95 days	Leiperville, Pennsylvania, U.S.
113	Loss	13–4–1 (95)	Harry Lewis	NWS	6	May 27, 1905	21 years, 71 days	National A.C., Philadelphia, Pennsylvania, U.S.
112	Win	13–4–1 (94)	"Kid" Herman Landfield	NWS	6	May 19, 1905	21 years, 63 days	Knickerbocker A.C., Philadelphia, Pennsylvania, U.S.
111	Draw	13–4–1 (93)	"Kid" Herman Landfield	NWS	6	Apr 24, 1905	21 years, 38 days	Washington S.C., Philadelphia, Pennsylvania, U.S.
110	Win	13–4–1 (92)	Aurelio Herrera	NWS	6	Apr 15, 1905	21 years, 17 days	National A.C., Philadelphia, Pennsylvania, U.S.
109	Draw	13–4–1 (91)	Young Corbett II	NWS	6	Apr 3, 1905	21 years, 17 days	Washington S.C., Philadelphia, Pennsylvania, U.S.
108	Win	13–4–1 (90)	Jim Bonner	NWS	15	Mar 22, 1905	21 years, 5 days	Pottsville, Pennsylvania, U.S.
107	Win	13–4–1 (89)	Eddie McAvoy	NWS	6	Mar 17, 1905	21 years, 0 days	Kensington A.C., Philadelphia, Pennsylvania, U.S.
106	Win	13–4–1 (88)	Clarence Forbes	NWS	6	Feb 25, 1905	20 years, 345 days	National A.C., Philadelphia, Pennsylvania, U.S.
105	Win	13–4–1 (87)	Kid Sullivan	NWS	6	Feb 20, 1905	20 years, 340 days	Washington S.C., Philadelphia, Pennsylvania, U.S.
104	Win	13–4–1 (86)	Tim Callahan	NWS	6	Feb 16, 1905	20 years, 336 days	Broadway A.C., Philadelphia, Pennsylvania, U.S.
103	Win	13–4–1 (85)	Jimmy Kelly	KO	1 (6)	Feb 4, 1905	20 years, 324 days	Richmond A.C., Philadelphia, Pennsylvania, U.S.
102	Win	12–4–1 (85)	Jack O'Neil	NWS	6	Jan 26, 1905	20 years, 315 days	Broadway A.C., Philadelphia, Pennsylvania, U.S.
101	Win	12–4–1 (84)	William H. Smith	NWS	6	Jan 20, 1905	20 years, 309 days	Kensington A.C., Philadelphia, Pennsylvania, U.S.
100	Win	12–4–1 (83)	Tommy Coleman	NWS	6	Dec 31, 1904	20 years, 289 days	Richmond A.C., Philadelphia, Pennsylvania, U.S.
99	Win	12–4–1 (82)	Jim Bonner	NWS	6	Dec 26, 1904	20 years, 284 days	National A.C., Philadelphia, Pennsylvania, U.S.
98	Win	12–4–1 (81)	Johnny White	DQ	4 (6)	Dec 16, 1904	20 years, 274 days	Manhattan A.C., Philadelphia, Pennsylvania, U.S.
97	Win	11–4–1 (81)	Billy Willis	NWS	6	Dec 10, 1904	20 years, 268 days	Richmond A.C., Philadelphia, Pennsylvania, U.S.
96	Win	11–4–1 (80)	Tommy Coleman	NWS	6	Nov 26, 1904	20 years, 254 days	Richmond A.C., Philadelphia, Pennsylvania, U.S.
95	Loss	11–4–1 (79)	Abe Attell	PTS	20	Nov 19, 1904	20 years, 247 days	West End A.C., Saint Louis, Missouri, U.S.
94	Win	11–3–1 (79)	George Decker	NWS	6	Nov 12, 1904	20 years, 240 days	Richmond A.C., Philadelphia, Pennsylvania, U.S.
93	Win	11–3–1 (78)	Johnny Marto	NWS	6	Oct 18, 1904	20 years, 215 days	Manhattan A.C., Philadelphia, Pennsylvania, U.S.
92	Win	11–3–1 (77)	Billy Maharg	NWS	6	Oct 15, 1904	20 years, 212 days	Richmond A.C., Philadelphia, Pennsylvania, U.S.
91	Draw	11–3–1 (76)	Billy Maharg	PTS	10	Oct 13, 1904	20 years, 210 days	Mahanoy City, Pennsylvania, U.S.
90	Win	11–3 (76)	Tommy Coleman	NWS	6	Sep 24, 1904	20 years, 191 days	Richmond A.C., Philadelphia, Pennsylvania, U.S.
89	Win	11–3 (75)	George Decker	NWS	6	Sep 16, 1904	20 years, 183 days	Manhattan A.C., Philadelphia, Pennsylvania, U.S.
88	Win	11–3 (74)	Johnny Marto	NWS	6	Sep 3, 1904	20 years, 170 days	Richmond A.C., Philadelphia, Pennsylvania, U.S.
87	Win	11–3 (73)	George Walker	NWS	6	Aug 18, 1904	20 years, 154 days	Broadway A.C., Philadelphia, Pennsylvania, U.S.
86	Loss	11–3 (72)	Chester Goodwin	NWS	6	Aug 6, 1904	20 years, 142 days	National A.C., Philadelphia, Pennsylvania, U.S.
85	Win	11–3 (71)	Billy Kolb	NWS	6	Jul 1, 1904	20 years, 106 days	Manhattan A.C., Philadelphia, Pennsylvania, U.S.
84	Win	11–3 (70)	Johnny Marto	NWS	6	Jun 20, 1904	20 years, 95 days	National A.C., Philadelphia, Pennsylvania, U.S.
83	Win	11–3 (69)	Jimmy Devine	NWS	6	Jun 9, 1904	20 years, 84 days	Broadway A.C., Philadelphia, Pennsylvania, U.S.
82	Win	11–3 (68)	Johnny Marto	NWS	6	Jun 6, 1904	20 years, 81 days	National A.C., Philadelphia, Pennsylvania, U.S.
81	Loss	11–3 (67)	Johnny Marto	NWS	6	May 25, 1904	20 years, 69 days	National A.C., Philadelphia, Pennsylvania, U.S.
80	Loss	11–3 (66)	Abe Attell	NWS	6	May 14, 1904	20 years, 58 days	National A.C., Philadelphia, Pennsylvania, U.S.
79	Win	11–3 (65)	Young Donahue	NWS	6	Apr 16, 1904	20 years, 30 days	National A.C., Philadelphia, Pennsylvania, U.S.
78	Win	11–3 (64)	Young Donahue	NWS	6	Apr 9, 1904	20 years, 23 days	National A.C., Philadelphia, Pennsylvania, U.S.
77	Draw	11–3 (63)	Johnny Marto	NWS	6	Mar 25, 1904	20 years, 8 days	Lenox A.C., Philadelphia, Pennsylvania, U.S.
76	Draw	11–3 (62)	Abe Attell	NWS	6	Feb 27, 1904	19 years, 347 days	National A.C., Philadelphia, Pennsylvania, U.S.
75	Win	11–3 (61)	Tom O'Hara	NWS	6	Feb 15, 1904	19 years, 335 days	Lenox A.C., Philadelphia, Pennsylvania, U.S.
74	Loss	11–3 (60)	Tom O'Hara	NWS	6	Feb 5, 1904	19 years, 325 days	Lenox A.C., Philadelphia, Pennsylvania, U.S.
73	Win	11–3 (59)	Jack Lowery	NWS	6	Jan 30, 1904	19 years, 319 days	National A.C., Philadelphia, Pennsylvania, U.S.
72	Loss	11–3 (58)	Jimmy Devine	TKO	2 (6)	Dec 17, 1903	19 years, 275 days	Broadway A.C., Philadelphia, Pennsylvania, U.S.
71	Win	11–2 (58)	Willie Diddles	NWS	6	Dec 3, 1903	19 years, 261 days	Broadway A.C., Philadelphia, Pennsylvania, U.S.
70	Draw	11–2 (57)	George Hoey	NWS	6	Nov 21, 1903	19 years, 249 days	National A.C., Philadelphia, Pennsylvania, U.S.
69	Loss	11–2 (56)	Jack O'Neil	TKO	3 (6)	Oct 19, 1903	19 years, 216 days	National Hall, Chester, Pennsylvania, U.S.
68	Win	11–1 (56)	Jack O'Neil	NWS	6	Aug 20, 1903	19 years, 156 days	Broadway A.C., Philadelphia, Pennsylvania, U.S.
67	Win	11–1 (55)	Jack McClain	KO	1 (6)	Aug 6, 1903	19 years, 142 days	Broadway A.C., Chester, Pennsylvania, U.S.
66	Loss	10–1 (55)	Tommy Love	NWS	6	Jun 16, 1903	19 years, 91 days	Southern A.C., Philadelphia, Pennsylvania, U.S.
65	Draw	10–1 (54)	George Decker	NWS	6	May 28, 1903	19 years, 72 days	Broadway A.C., Philadelphia, Pennsylvania, U.S.
64	Win	10–1 (53)	Joe Mace	NWS	6	May 2, 1903	19 years, 46 days	Broadway A.C., Philadelphia, Pennsylvania, U.S.
63	Win	10–1 (52)	Tony Moran	NWS	6	Apr 23, 1903	19 years, 37 days	Broadway A.C., Philadelphia, Pennsylvania, U.S.
62	Loss	10–1 (51)	Abraham "Kid" Goodman	PTS	12	Apr 20, 1903	19 years, 34 days	West End A.C., Lawrence, Massachusetts, U.S.
61	Win	10–0 (51)	Jack Dorman	NWS	6	Apr 15, 1903	19 years, 29 days	National A.C., Philadelphia, Pennsylvania, U.S.
60	Win	10–0 (50)	Jack Dorman	NWS	6	Apr 9, 1903	19 years, 23 days	Broadway A.C., Philadelphia, Pennsylvania, U.S.
59	Draw	10–0 (49)	Billy Maharg	NWS	6	Mar 26, 1903	19 years, 9 days	Broadway A.C., Philadelphia, Pennsylvania, U.S.
58	Draw	10–0 (48)	Tony Moran	NWS	6	Feb 14, 1903	18 years, 334 days	National A.C., Philadelphia, Pennsylvania, U.S.
57	Win	10–0 (47)	Jimmy Simister	NWS	6	Jan 3, 1903	18 years, 292 days	National A.C., Philadelphia, Pennsylvania, U.S.
56	Win	10–0 (46)	Jimmy Simister	NWS	6	Dec 27, 1902	18 years, 285 days	National A.C., Philadelphia, Pennsylvania, U.S.
55	Win	10–0 (45)	Danny Brennan	NWS	6	Dec 14, 1902	18 years, 272 days	National A.C., Philadelphia, Pennsylvania, U.S.
54	Draw	10–0 (44)	Billy Maynard	NWS	6	Nov 29, 1902	18 years, 257 days	National A.C., Philadelphia, Pennsylvania, U.S.
53	Loss	10–0 (43)	Young Corbett II	NWS	6	Oct 27, 1902	18 years, 224 days	Washington S.C., Philadelphia, Pennsylvania, U.S.
52	Draw	10–0 (42)	Eddie Lenny	NWS	6	Oct 20, 1902	18 years, 217 days	Washington S.C., Philadelphia, Pennsylvania, U.S.
51	Win	10–0 (41)	Sammy Meyers	NWS	6	Oct 4, 1902	18 years, 201 days	National A.C., Philadelphia, Pennsylvania, U.S.
50	Draw	10–0 (40)	Billy Ryan	NWS	6	Sep 20, 1902	18 years, 187 days	National A.C., Philadelphia, Pennsylvania, U.S.
49	Draw	10–0 (39)	Sammy Smith	NWS	6	Sep 4, 1902	18 years, 171 days	Broadway A.C., Philadelphia, Pennsylvania, U.S.
48	Win	10–0 (38)	Joe "Buck" Kelly	NWS	6	Sep 2, 1902	18 years, 169 days	Knickerbocker A.C., Philadelphia, Pennsylvania, U.S.
47	Win	10–0 (37)	Cole Watson	NWS	6	Aug 28, 1902	18 years, 164 days	Broadway A.C., Philadelphia, Pennsylvania, U.S.
46	Loss	10–0 (36)	Sammy Smith	NWS	6	Aug 23, 1902	18 years, 159 days	National A.C., Philadelphia, Pennsylvania, U.S.
45	Win	10–0 (35)	Eddie Lenny	NWS	6	Aug 16, 1902	18 years, 152 days	National A.C., Philadelphia, Pennsylvania, U.S.
44	Win	10–0 (34)	Eddie Lenny	NWS	6	Aug 12, 1902	18 years, 148 days	National A.C., Philadelphia, Pennsylvania, U.S.
43	Loss	10–0 (33)	Billy Maharg	NWS	6	Aug 11, 1902	18 years, 147 days	Golden Gate A.C., Philadelphia, Pennsylvania, U.S.
42	Win	10–0 (32)	Eddie Lenny	DQ	5 (6)	Aug 4, 1902	18 years, 140 days	National A.C., Philadelphia, Pennsylvania, U.S.
41	Win	9–0 (32)	Kid Sullivan	NWS	6	Jul 28, 1902	18 years, 133 days	National A.C., Philadelphia, Pennsylvania, U.S.
40	Draw	9–0 (31)	Jimmy Simister	NWS	6	Jul 19, 1902	18 years, 124 days	Central A.C., Philadelphia, Pennsylvania, U.S.
39	Loss	9–0 (30)	Tim Callahan	NWS	6	Jul 3, 1902	18 years, 108 days	Broadway A.C., Philadelphia, Pennsylvania, U.S.
38	Loss	9–0 (29)	Billy Maynard	NWS	6	Apr 21, 1902	18 years, 35 days	Knickerbocker A.C., Philadelphia, Pennsylvania, U.S.
37	Win	9–0 (28)	Joe Fairburn	NWS	6	Apr 19, 1902	18 years, 33 days	National A.C., Philadelphia, Pennsylvania, U.S.
36	Win	9–0 (27)	John Loxley	NWS	6	Apr 12, 1902	18 years, 26 days	Knickerbocker A.C., Philadelphia, Pennsylvania, U.S.
35	Win	9–0 (26)	John Henry Johnson	NWS	6	Apr 8, 1902	18 years, 22 days	Penn Art Club, Philadelphia, Pennsylvania, U.S.
34	Win	9–0 (25)	Hugh Dougherty	NWS	6	Apr 5, 1902	18 years, 19 days	Knickerbocker A.C., Philadelphia, Pennsylvania, U.S.
33	Win	9–0 (24)	Hugh Dougherty	NWS	6	Mar 29, 1902	18 years, 12 days	Knickerbocker A.C., Philadelphia, Pennsylvania, U.S.
32	Draw	9–0 (23)	Cole Watson	NWS	6	Mar 26, 1902	18 years, 9 days	Penn Art Club, Philadelphia, Pennsylvania, U.S.
31	Win	9–0 (22)	Billy Maynard	NWS	6	Mar 22, 1902	18 years, 5 days	Knickerbocker A.C., Philadelphia, Pennsylvania, U.S.
30	Draw	9–0 (21)	Sammy Smith	NWS	6	Mar 19, 1902	18 years, 2 days	Penn Art Club, Philadelphia, Pennsylvania, U.S.
29	Win	9–0 (20)	Jimmy Simister	NWS	6	Mar 15, 1902	17 years, 363 days	Knickerbocker A.C., Philadelphia, Pennsylvania, U.S.
28	Win	9–0 (19)	Danny Casey	NWS	6	Mar 8, 1902	17 years, 356 days	Knickerbocker A.C., Philadelphia, Pennsylvania, U.S.
27	Win	8–0 (19)	Billy Burroughs	NWS	6	Mar 1, 1902	17 years, 349 days	Knickerbocker A.C., Philadelphia, Pennsylvania, U.S.
26	Win	8–0 (18)	Eddie Rocap	NWS	6	Feb 22, 1902	17 years, 342 days	Knickerbocker A.C., Philadelphia, Pennsylvania, U.S.
25	Loss	8–0 (17)	Patsy Donovan	NWS	6	Feb 18, 1902	17 years, 338 days	Nonpareil A.C., Philadelphia, Pennsylvania, U.S.
24	Win	8–0 (16)	Jack Lansing	NWS	6	Feb 15, 1902	17 years, 335 days	Knickerbocker A.C., Philadelphia, Pennsylvania, U.S.
23	Win	8–0 (15)	Jimmy O'Brien	KO	2 (6)	Feb 8, 1902	17 years, 328 days	Knickerbocker A.C., Philadelphia, Pennsylvania, U.S.
22	Win	7–0 (15)	George Decker	NWS	6	Feb 4, 1902	17 years, 324 days	West Philadelphia A.C., Philadelphia, Pennsylvania, U.S.
21	Draw	7–0 (14)	George Decker	NWS	6	Feb 3, 1902	17 years, 323 days	Knickerbocker A.C., Philadelphia, Pennsylvania, U.S.
20	Win	7–0 (13)	Charles Abramowitz	NWS	6	Jan 27, 1902	17 years, 316 days	Penn Art Club, Philadelphia, Pennsylvania, U.S.
19	Draw	7–0 (12)	Danny Cain	NWS	6	Jan 27, 1902	17 years, 316 days	Knickerbocker A.C., Philadelphia, Pennsylvania, U.S.
18	Win	7–0 (11)	Al Paxton	TKO	2 (6)	Jan 25, 1902	17 years, 314 days	Nonpareil A.C., Philadelphia, Pennsylvania, U.S.
17	Win	6–0 (11)	Muckles Muldoon	TKO	3 (6)	Jan 20, 1902	17 years, 309 days	Knickerbocker A.C., Philadelphia, Pennsylvania, U.S.
16	Win	5–0 (11)	John Henry Johnson	PTS	10	Jan 17, 1902	17 years, 306 days	Keystone A.C., Allentown, Pennsylvania, U.S.
15	Win	4–0 (11)	Fred Martin	KO	4 (6)	Jan 13, 1902	17 years, 302 days	Knickerbocker A.C., Philadelphia, Pennsylvania, U.S.
14	Win	3–0 (11)	Kid May	NWS	6	Jan 11, 1902	17 years, 300 days	Nonpareil A.C., Philadelphia, Pennsylvania, U.S.
13	Win	3–0 (10)	John Henry Johnson	NWS	6	Jan 6, 1902	17 years, 295 days	Knickerbocker A.C., Philadelphia, Pennsylvania, U.S.
12	Win	3–0 (9)	Young Kelly	NWS	6	Jan 4, 1902	17 years, 293 days	National A.C., Philadelphia, Pennsylvania, U.S.
11	Win	3–0 (8)	Young Marshall	NWS	6	Dec 30, 1901	17 years, 288 days	Knickerbocker A.C., Philadelphia, Pennsylvania, U.S.
10	Win	3–0 (7)	Tom O'Hara	NWS	6	Dec 23, 1901	17 years, 281 days	Knickerbocker A.C., Philadelphia, Pennsylvania, U.S.
9	Win	3–0 (6)	Spike Connolly	NWS	6	Dec 21, 1901	17 years, 279 days	National A.C., Philadelphia, Pennsylvania, U.S.
8	Win	3–0 (5)	Kid Garrett	NWS	6	Dec 16, 1901	17 years, 274 days	Knickerbocker A.C., Philadelphia, Pennsylvania, U.S.
7	Win	3–0 (4)	Young Marshall	KO	5 (6)	Dec 20, 1900	16 years, 278 days	Knickerbocker A.C., Philadelphia, Pennsylvania, U.S.
6	Win	2–0 (4)	Jack Rice	KO	5 (6)	Nov 29, 1900	16 years, 257 days	Knickerbocker A.C., Philadelphia, Pennsylvania, U.S.
5	Loss	1–0 (4)	Bobby Foster	NWS	4	Nov 15, 1900	16 years, 243 days	Knickerbocker A.C., Philadelphia, Pennsylvania, U.S.
4	Draw	1–0 (3)	George Decker	NWS	6	Nov 8, 1900	16 years, 236 days	Knickerbocker A.C., Philadelphia, Pennsylvania, U.S.
3	Win	1–0 (2)	Lew Barber	NWS	6	Oct 26, 1900	16 years, 223 days	Gray's Ferry A.C., Philadelphia, Pennsylvania, U.S.
2	Win	1–0 (1)	Tom Markey	KO	4 (6)	Sep 21, 1900	16 years, 188 days	Gray's Ferry A.C., Philadelphia, Pennsylvania, U.S.
1	Draw	0–0 (1)	Kid Egan	NWS	6	Jul 16, 1900	16 years, 121 days	Broadway A.C., Philadelphia, Pennsylvania, U.S.

=== Unofficial record ===
274 fights	163 wins	59 losses
By knockout	15	4
By decision	145	55
By disqualification	3	0
Draws	52	

Record with the inclusion of newspaper decisions in the win/loss/draw column.

No.	Result	Record	Opponent	Type	Round(s)	Date	Age	Location
274	Loss	164–58–52	Steve Latzo	KO	5 (10)	Oct 22, 1917	33 years, 219 days	Maennerchor Hall, Hazleton, Pennsylvania, U.S.
273	Loss	164–57–52	Milburn Saylor	NWS	6	Jun 11, 1917	33 years, 86 days	Broadway A.C., Philadelphia, Pennsylvania, U.S.
272	Win	164–56–52	George "Kid" Alberts	NWS	6	May 3, 1917	33 years, 47 days	Auditorium, Reading, Pennsylvania, U.S.
271	Draw	163–56–52	Mickey Sheridan	NWS	6	Oct 13, 1916	32 years, 210 days	Lincoln A.C., Philadelphia, Pennsylvania, U.S.
270	Win	163–56–51	Henry Hauber	NWS	6	Sep 7, 1916	32 years, 174 days	Broadway A.C., Philadelphia, Pennsylvania, U.S.
269	Draw	162–56–51	Henry Hauber	NWS	6	Aug 7, 1916	32 years, 143 days	Broadway A.C., Philadelphia, Pennsylvania, U.S.
268	Loss	162–56–50	Young Jack O'Brien	NWS	6	Jun 23, 1916	32 years, 98 days	Lincoln A.C., Philadelphia, Pennsylvania, U.S.
267	Win	162–55–50	Ritz Walters	NWS	6	May 26, 1916	32 years, 70 days	Lincoln A.C., Philadelphia, Pennsylvania, U.S.
266	Loss	161–55–50	Mike O'Dowd	NWS	6	Mar 18, 1916	32 years, 1 day	National A.C., Philadelphia, Pennsylvania, U.S.
265	Loss	161–54–50	"Young" Tommy Coleman	NWS	6	Mar 6, 1915	30 years, 354 days	National A.C., Philadelphia, Pennsylvania, U.S.
264	Loss	161–53–50	"Young" Tommy Coleman	NWS	6	Jan 29, 1915	30 years, 318 days	Quaker City A.C., Philadelphia, Pennsylvania, U.S.
263	Loss	161–52–50	Al Thiel	NWS	6	Nov 7, 1914	30 years, 235 days	National A.C., Philadelphia, Pennsylvania, U.S.
262	Draw	161–51–50	Jack Toland	NWS	6	May 28, 1914	30 years, 72 days	Broadway A.C., Philadelphia, Pennsylvania, U.S.
261	Loss	161–51–49	Italian Joe Gans	NWS	6	Mar 28, 1914	30 years, 11 days	National A.C., Philadelphia, Pennsylvania, U.S.
260	Win	161–50–49	Bert Stanley	NWS	6	Nov 22, 1913	29 years, 250 days	National A.C., Philadelphia, Pennsylvania, U.S.
259	Draw	160–50–49	Frank Lynn	NWS	6	Nov 19, 1913	29 years, 247 days	Windsor, Ontario, Canada
258	Draw	160–50–48	Tommy Howell	NWS	6	Oct 20, 1913	29 years, 217 days	Olympia A.C., Philadelphia, Pennsylvania, U.S.
257	Draw	160–50–47	Joe Hirst	NWS	6	Sep 1, 1913	29 years, 168 days	Olympia A.C., Philadelphia, Pennsylvania, U.S.
256	Loss	160–50–46	Marcel Thomas	NWS	6	Jul 4, 1913	29 years, 109 days	Point Breeze Velodrome, Philadelphia, Pennsylvania, U.S.
255	Loss	160–49–46	Phil Cross	NWS	6	May 5, 1913	29 years, 49 days	Olympia A.C., Philadelphia, Pennsylvania, U.S.
254	Loss	160–48–46	Perry "Kid" Graves	NWS	6	Apr 19, 1913	29 years, 33 days	National A.C., Philadelphia, Pennsylvania, U.S.
253	Draw	160–47–46	Tommy Howell	NWS	6	Apr 5, 1913	29 years, 19 days	National A.C., Philadelphia, Pennsylvania, U.S.
252	Draw	160–47–45	Tommy Howell	NWS	6	Feb 17, 1913	28 years, 337 days	Olympia A.C., Philadelphia, Pennsylvania, U.S.
251	Win	160–47–44	Tommy Howell	NWS	6	Feb 3, 1913	28 years, 323 days	Olympia A.C., Philadelphia, Pennsylvania, U.S.
250	Draw	159–47–44	Eddie Shevlin	NWS	6	Jan 11, 1913	28 years, 300 days	National A.C., Philadelphia, Pennsylvania, U.S.
249	Win	159–47–43	Jack Fink	NWS	6	Dec 12, 1912	28 years, 270 days	Broadway A.C., Philadelphia, Pennsylvania, U.S.
248	Loss	158–47–43	"Young" Tommy Coleman	NWS	6	Dec 6, 1912	28 years, 264 days	Nonpareil A.C., Philadelphia, Pennsylvania, U.S.
247	Loss	158–46–43	Al McCoy	NWS	6	Nov 9, 1912	28 years, 237 days	National A.C., Philadelphia, Pennsylvania, U.S.
246	Loss	158–45–43	Red Robinson	NWS	6	Oct 5, 1912	28 years, 202 days	National A.C., Philadelphia, Pennsylvania, U.S.
245	Loss	158–44–43	Packey McFarland	NWS	6	May 15, 1912	28 years, 59 days	National A.C., Philadelphia, Pennsylvania, U.S.
244	Loss	158–43–43	Valentine K.O. Brown	NWS	10	Apr 15, 1912	28 years, 29 days	Madison A.C., New York City, New York, U.S.
243	Win	158–42–43	Young Jack O'Brien	NWS	6	Mar 29, 1912	28 years, 12 days	American A.C., Philadelphia, Pennsylvania, U.S.
242	Loss	157–42–43	Valentine K.O. Brown	NWS	6	Mar 13, 1912	27 years, 362 days	National A.C., Philadelphia, Pennsylvania, U.S.
241	Win	157–41–43	Jack Ward	NWS	6	Mar 2, 1912	27 years, 351 days	National A.C., Philadelphia, Pennsylvania, U.S.
240	Loss	156–41–43	Ray Bronson	NWS	10	Feb 22, 1912	27 years, 342 days	Auditorium, Indianapolis, Indiana, U.S.
239	Loss	156–40–43	Willie Ritchie	NWS	6	Feb 7, 1912	27 years, 327 days	National A.C., Philadelphia, Pennsylvania, U.S.
238	Win	156–39–43	Tommy Furey	PTS	15	Jan 16, 1912	27 years, 305 days	Thornton, New Jersey, U.S.
237	Win	155–39–43	Tommy Howell	NWS	6	Jan 13, 1912	27 years, 302 days	National A.C., Philadelphia, Pennsylvania, U.S.
236	Draw	154–39–43	Mike Gibbons	NWS	6	Dec 16, 1911	27 years, 274 days	National A.C., Philadelphia, Pennsylvania, U.S.
235	Win	154–39–42	Willie Moody	NWS	6	Dec 8, 1911	27 years, 266 days	Nonpareil A.C., Philadelphia, Pennsylvania, U.S.
234	Win	153–39–42	George Ashe	NWS	6	Dec 7, 1911	27 years, 265 days	Broadway A.C., Philadelphia, Pennsylvania, U.S.
233	Win	152–39–42	Frank Loughrey	NWS	6	Dec 4, 1911	27 years, 262 days	American A.C., Philadelphia, Pennsylvania, U.S.
232	Win	151–39–42	"Young" John McCartney	NWS	6	Nov 25, 1911	27 years, 253 days	National A.C., Philadelphia, Pennsylvania, U.S.
231	Win	150–39–42	"Young" Joe Griffo	NWS	6	Nov 23, 1911	27 years, 251 days	Broadway A.C., Philadelphia, Pennsylvania, U.S.
230	Loss	149–39–42	Joe Sieger	NWS	6	Nov 21, 1911	27 years, 249 days	Douglas A.C., Philadelphia, Pennsylvania, U.S.
229	Win	149–38–42	Cy Smith	NWS	6	Nov 20, 1911	27 years, 248 days	American A.C., Philadelphia, Pennsylvania, U.S.
228	Win	148–38–42	"Young" Kid Broad	NWS	6	Nov 2, 1911	27 years, 230 days	Broadway A.C., Philadelphia, Pennsylvania, U.S.
227	Win	147–38–42	"Young" Tommy Coleman	NWS	6	Oct 27, 1911	27 years, 224 days	National A.C., Philadelphia, Pennsylvania, U.S.
226	Win	146–38–42	Jimmy Perry	NWS	6	Oct 14, 1911	27 years, 211 days	National A.C., Philadelphia, Pennsylvania, U.S.
225	Win	145–38–42	Battling Mauldin	NWS	6	Oct 12, 1911	27 years, 209 days	Broadway A.C., Philadelphia, Pennsylvania, U.S.
224	Win	144–38–42	Johnny Willetts	NWS	6	Sep 21, 1911	27 years, 188 days	Broadway A.C., Philadelphia, Pennsylvania, U.S.
223	Win	143–38–42	Eddie Palmer	NWS	6	Sep 19, 1911	27 years, 186 days	Douglas A.C., Philadelphia, Pennsylvania, U.S.
222	Loss	142–38–42	"Young" Tommy Coleman	NWS	6	Sep 15, 1911	27 years, 182 days	Nonpareil A.C., Philadelphia, Pennsylvania, U.S.
221	Win	142–37–42	Johnny Krause	NWS	6	Sep 1, 1911	27 years, 168 days	Nonpareil A.C., Philadelphia, Pennsylvania, U.S.
220	Loss	141–37–42	Tommy Howell	NWS	6	Aug 15, 1911	27 years, 151 days	Douglas A.C., Philadelphia, Pennsylvania, U.S.
219	Draw	141–36–42	Barney Ford	NWS	6	Aug 10, 1911	27 years, 146 days	Broadway A.C., Philadelphia, Pennsylvania, U.S.
218	Draw	141–36–41	Barney Ford	PTS	6	Jul 27, 1911	27 years, 132 days	Broadway A.C., Philadelphia, Pennsylvania, U.S.
217	Win	141–36–40	Johnny Krause	NWS	6	Jul 6, 1911	27 years, 111 days	Broadway A.C., Philadelphia, Pennsylvania, U.S.
216	Win	140–36–40	Jimmy Fryer	NWS	6	Jun 29, 1911	27 years, 104 days	Broadway A.C., Philadelphia, Pennsylvania, U.S.
215	Win	139–36–40	Young Ahearn	NWS	6	May 22, 1911	27 years, 66 days	American A.C., Philadelphia, Pennsylvania, U.S.
214	Loss	138–36–40	Johnny Glover	NWS	6	Apr 24, 1911	27 years, 38 days	American A.C., Philadelphia, Pennsylvania, U.S.
213	Win	138–35–40	"Young" William Nitchie	NWS	6	Apr 18, 1911	27 years, 32 days	Douglas A.C., Philadelphia, Pennsylvania, U.S.
212	Win	137–35–40	Joe Heffernan	NWS	6	Mar 27, 1911	27 years, 10 days	American A.C., Philadelphia, Pennsylvania, U.S.
211	Win	136–35–40	"Young" William Nitchie	NWS	6	Mar 14, 1911	26 years, 362 days	Douglas A.C., Philadelphia, Pennsylvania, U.S.
210	Loss	135–35–40	Mike Glover	NWS	6	Mar 4, 1911	26 years, 352 days	American A.C., Philadelphia, Pennsylvania, U.S.
209	Loss	135–34–40	Packey McFarland	NWS	6	Jan 25, 1911	26 years, 314 days	National A.C., Philadelphia, Pennsylvania, U.S.
208	Win	135–33–40	Billy Willis	NWS	6	Jan 2, 1911	26 years, 291 days	American A.C., Philadelphia, Pennsylvania, U.S.
207	Win	134–33–40	Young Kid Broad	NWS	6	Nov 29, 1910	26 years, 257 days	Douglas A.C., Philadelphia, Pennsylvania, U.S.
206	Draw	133–33–40	Johnny Krause	NWS	6	Nov 18, 1910	26 years, 246 days	Central A.C., Philadelphia, Pennsylvania, U.S.
205	Win	133–33–39	Sammy Smith	NWS	6	Nov 12, 1910	26 years, 240 days	National A.C., Philadelphia, Pennsylvania, U.S.
204	Draw	132–33–39	Young Kid Broad	NWS	3	Nov 8, 1910	26 years, 236 days	Douglas A.C., Philadelphia, Pennsylvania, U.S.
203	Win	132–33–38	Charley "Twin" Miller	NWS	3	Nov 8, 1910	26 years, 236 days	Douglas A.C., Philadelphia, Pennsylvania, U.S.
202	Loss	131–33–38	Sammy Smith	NWS	6	Nov 5, 1910	26 years, 233 days	National A.C., Philadelphia, Pennsylvania, U.S.
201	Win	131–32–38	Joe Hirst	TKO	6 (6)	Oct 22, 1910	26 years, 219 days	National A.C., Philadelphia, Pennsylvania, U.S.
200	Win	130–32–38	Tommy Howell	NWS	6	Oct 18, 1910	26 years, 215 days	Douglas A.C., Philadelphia, Pennsylvania, U.S.
199	Win	129–32–38	Tommy Howell	DQ	6 (6)	Oct 4, 1910	26 years, 201 days	Douglas A.C., Philadelphia, Pennsylvania, U.S.
198	Win	128–32–38	Billy Donovan	NWS	6	Jul 18, 1910	26 years, 123 days	Lehigh A.C., Philadelphia, Pennsylvania, U.S.
197	Win	127–32–38	"Young" Sammy Smith	NWS	6	Jul 14, 1910	26 years, 119 days	Broadway A.C., Philadelphia, Pennsylvania, U.S.
196	Win	126–32–38	"Young" William Nitchie	NWS	6	Jul 12, 1910	26 years, 117 days	Douglas A.C., Philadelphia, Pennsylvania, U.S.
195	Win	125–32–38	Billy Willis	NWS	6	Jun 21, 1910	26 years, 96 days	Douglas A.C., Philadelphia, Pennsylvania, U.S.
194	Win	124–32–38	"Young" James Smedley	KO	3 (6)	Jun 14, 1910	26 years, 89 days	Douglas A.C., Philadelphia, Pennsylvania, U.S.
193	Win	123–32–38	Billy Willis	NWS	6	Jun 7, 1910	26 years, 82 days	Douglas A.C., Philadelphia, Pennsylvania, U.S.
192	Win	122–32–38	Tommy O'Keefe	KO	2 (6)	May 28, 1910	26 years, 72 days	Broadway A.C., Philadelphia, Pennsylvania, U.S.
191	Win	121–32–38	Tommy Stone	NWS	6	May 16, 1910	26 years, 60 days	Armory, Harrisburg, Pennsylvania, U.S.
190	Loss	120–32–38	Leo Houck	NWS	6	Apr 15, 1910	26 years, 29 days	Douglas A.C., Philadelphia, Pennsylvania, U.S.
189	Loss	120–31–38	Leo Houck	NWS	6	Mar 31, 1910	26 years, 14 days	Lancaster A.C., Lancaster, Pennsylvania, U.S.
188	Win	120–30–38	Willie Fitzgerald	NWS	6	Mar 26, 1910	26 years, 9 days	National A.C., Philadelphia, Pennsylvania, U.S.
187	Win	119–30–38	Mickey Gannon	NWS	6	Mar 5, 1910	25 years, 353 days	National A.C., Philadelphia, Pennsylvania, U.S.
186	Win	118–30–38	Jack Britton	NWS	6	Feb 22, 1910	25 years, 342 days	Douglas A.C., Philadelphia, Pennsylvania, U.S.
185	Draw	117–30–38	Leo Houck	NWS	6	Feb 12, 1910	25 years, 332 days	National A.C., Philadelphia, Pennsylvania, U.S.
184	Win	117–30–37	Billy Willis	NWS	6	Feb 1, 1910	25 years, 321 days	Douglas A.C., Philadelphia, Pennsylvania, U.S.
183	Win	116–30–37	Fred Corbett	NWS	6	Jan 22, 1910	25 years, 311 days	National A.C., Philadelphia, Pennsylvania, U.S.
182	Win	115–30–37	Joe Hirst	NWS	6	Jan 18, 1910	25 years, 307 days	Douglas A.C., Philadelphia, Pennsylvania, U.S.
181	Win	114–30–37	Willie Lucas	NWS	6	Dec 21, 1909	25 years, 279 days	Douglas A.C., Philadelphia, Pennsylvania, U.S.
180	Win	113–30–37	"Young" William Nitchie	NWS	6	Dec 11, 1909	25 years, 269 days	National A.C., Philadelphia, Pennsylvania, U.S.
179	Win	112–30–37	Harlem Tommy Murphy	NWS	6	Nov 20, 1909	25 years, 248 days	National A.C., Philadelphia, Pennsylvania, U.S.
178	Win	111–30–37	Johnny Willetts	NWS	6	Nov 13, 1909	25 years, 241 days	National A.C., Philadelphia, Pennsylvania, U.S.
177	Win	110–30–37	Johnny Willetts	NWS	6	Oct 26, 1909	25 years, 223 days	Douglas A.C., Philadelphia, Pennsylvania, U.S.
176	Loss	109–30–37	Joe Hirst	NWS	6	Oct 7, 1909	25 years, 204 days	Broadway A.C., Philadelphia, Pennsylvania, U.S.
175	Win	109–29–37	Joe Hirst	NWS	6	Sep 29, 1909	25 years, 196 days	New Philadelphia A.C., Philadelphia, Pennsylvania, U.S.
174	Win	108–29–37	Fred Corbett	NWS	6	Sep 27, 1909	25 years, 194 days	West End A.C., Philadelphia, Pennsylvania, U.S.
173	Draw	107–29–37	Tommy O'Keefe	NWS	6	Sep 23, 1909	25 years, 190 days	Broadway A.C., Philadelphia, Pennsylvania, U.S.
172	Draw	107–29–36	Willie Lucas	NWS	6	Sep 10, 1909	25 years, 177 days	Nonpareil A.C., Philadelphia, Pennsylvania, U.S.
171	Draw	107–29–35	Fred Corbett	NWS	6	Sep 8, 1909	25 years, 175 days	New Philadelphia A.C., Philadelphia, Pennsylvania, U.S.
170	Win	107–29–34	Kid Locke	NWS	6	Sep 2, 1909	25 years, 169 days	Broadway A.C., Philadelphia, Pennsylvania, U.S.
169	Loss	106–29–34	Lew Powell	PTS	20	Jun 25, 1909	25 years, 100 days	Dreamland Rink, San Francisco, California, U.S.
168	Loss	106–28–34	Leach Cross	NWS	10	May 28, 1909	25 years, 72 days	Fairmont A.C., New York City, New York, U.S.
167	Loss	106–27–34	Freddie Welsh	PTS	20	Feb 20, 1909	24 years, 340 days	New Orleans, Louisiana, U.S.
166	Win	106–26–34	Mickey Gannon	NWS	6	Jan 11, 1909	24 years, 300 days	Washington S.C., Philadelphia, Pennsylvania, U.S.
165	Win	105–26–34	Leach Cross	NWS	6	Jan 4, 1909	24 years, 293 days	Washington S.C., Philadelphia, Pennsylvania, U.S.
164	Loss	104–26–34	Tommy Quill	PTS	12	Dec 1, 1908	24 years, 259 days	Armory A.A., Boston, Massachusetts, U.S.
163	Win	104–25–34	Eddie Murphy	NWS	12	Nov 17, 1908	24 years, 245 days	Armory A.A., Boston, Massachusetts, U.S.
162	Win	103–25–34	Billy Glover	NWS	6	Oct 29, 1908	24 years, 226 days	Broadway A.C., Philadelphia, Pennsylvania, U.S.
161	Loss	102–25–34	Young Otto	NWS	6	Oct 26, 1908	24 years, 223 days	Roman A.C., New York City, New York, U.S.
160	Loss	102–24–34	Young Loughrey	NWS	6	Oct 19, 1908	24 years, 216 days	State A.C., Philadelphia, Pennsylvania, U.S.
159	Loss	102–23–34	Willie Moody	NWS	6	Sep 7, 1908	24 years, 174 days	State A.C., Philadelphia, Pennsylvania, U.S.
158	Loss	102–22–34	Tommy Quill	PTS	12	Jun 30, 1908	24 years, 105 days	Armory A.A., Boston, Massachusetts, U.S.
157	Draw	102–21–34	Tommy Quill	PTS	12	May 26, 1908	24 years, 70 days	Armory A.A., Boston, Massachusetts, U.S.
156	Win	102–21–33	Harlem Tommy Murphy	NWS	6	Apr 11, 1908	24 years, 25 days	National A.C., Philadelphia, Pennsylvania, U.S.
155	Draw	101–21–33	Johnny Marto	NWS	6	Mar 25, 1908	24 years, 8 days	Sharkey A.C., New York City, New York, U.S.
154	Draw	101–21–32	Young Loughrey	NWS	6	Jan 11, 1908	23 years, 300 days	National A.C., Philadelphia, Pennsylvania, U.S.
153	Win	101–21–31	Joe Galligan	KO	5 (6)	Dec 25, 1907	23 years, 283 days	National A.C., Philadelphia, Pennsylvania, U.S.
152	Win	100–21–31	Willie Moody	NWS	6	Dec 14, 1907	23 years, 272 days	National A.C., Philadelphia, Pennsylvania, U.S.
151	Loss	99–21–31	Eddie Chambers	NWS	6	Nov 4, 1907	23 years, 232 days	Spring Garden A.C., Philadelphia, Pennsylvania, U.S.
150	Draw	99–20–31	"Young" Frank Kenny	NWS	6	Oct 12, 1907	23 years, 209 days	National A.C., Philadelphia, Pennsylvania, U.S.
149	Draw	99–20–30	Young French	PTS	6	Oct 9, 1907	23 years, 206 days	Elmira, New York, U.S.
148	Loss	99–20–29	Tommy Quill	NWS	6	Sep 21, 1907	23 years, 188 days	National A.C., Philadelphia, Pennsylvania, U.S.
147	Win	99–19–29	Johnny Summers	NWS	6	Jun 19, 1907	23 years, 94 days	National A.C., Philadelphia, Pennsylvania, U.S.
146	Win	98–19–29	"Young" Thomas Kloby	NWS	6	May 11, 1907	23 years, 55 days	National A.C., Philadelphia, Pennsylvania, U.S.
145	Win	97–19–29	Young Corbett II	NWS	6	Apr 27, 1907	23 years, 41 days	National A.C., Philadelphia, Pennsylvania, U.S.
144	Draw	96–19–29	Tom Prendergast	NWS	6	Apr 24, 1907	23 years, 38 days	Detroit, Michigan, U.S.
143	Win	96–19–28	Spike Robson	NWS	6	Mar 16, 1907	22 years, 364 days	National A.C., Philadelphia, Pennsylvania, U.S.
142	Win	95–19–28	George "Kid" Lavigne	TKO	6 (6)	Jan 19, 1907	22 years, 308 days	National A.C., Philadelphia, Pennsylvania, U.S.
141	Win	94–19–28	Eddie Chambers	NWS	6	Dec 25, 1906	22 years, 283 days	National A.C., Philadelphia, Pennsylvania, U.S.
140	Draw	93–19–28	Unk Russell	NWS	6	Dec 15, 1906	22 years, 273 days	National A.C., Philadelphia, Pennsylvania, U.S.
139	Win	93–19–27	"Young" Frank Kelly	NWS	6	Nov 29, 1906	22 years, 257 days	National A.C., Philadelphia, Pennsylvania, U.S.
138	Draw	92–19–27	Unk Russell	NWS	6	Oct 27, 1906	22 years, 224 days	National A.C., Philadelphia, Pennsylvania, U.S.
137	Draw	92–19–26	Unk Russell	NWS	6	Oct 6, 1906	22 years, 203 days	National A.C., Philadelphia, Pennsylvania, U.S.
136	Loss	92–19–25	Dave Deshler	PTS	15	Sep 26, 1906	22 years, 193 days	Lincoln A.C., Chelsea, Pennsylvania, U.S.
135	Win	92–18–25	Jack Cardiff	PTS	10	Aug 24, 1906	22 years, 160 days	Reading, Pennsylvania, U.S.
134	Loss	91–18–25	Freddie Welsh	NWS	6	Jul 13, 1906	22 years, 118 days	National A.C., Philadelphia, Pennsylvania, U.S.
133	Draw	91–17–25	Hock Keys	NWS	6	May 21, 1906	22 years, 65 days	Washington S.C., Philadelphia, Pennsylvania, U.S.
132	Win	91–17–24	Dave Deshler	NWS	6	May 14, 1906	22 years, 58 days	Washington S.C., Philadelphia, Pennsylvania, U.S.
131	Win	90–17–24	Kid Sullivan	NWS	6	Apr 23, 1906	22 years, 37 days	Washington S.C., Philadelphia, Pennsylvania, U.S.
130	Draw	89–17–24	Billy Finucane	PTS	10	Mar 9, 1906	21 years, 357 days	Terre Haute, Indiana, U.S.
129	Win	89–17–23	Charley Sieger	NWS	6	Feb 26, 1906	21 years, 346 days	Washington S.C., Philadelphia, Pennsylvania, U.S.
128	Loss	88–17–23	Jimmy Gardner	TKO	5 (6)	Feb 5, 1906	21 years, 325 days	Washington S.C., Philadelphia, Pennsylvania, U.S.
127	Draw	88–16–23	Maurice Sayers	NWS	6	Jan 15, 1906	21 years, 304 days	Washington S.C., Philadelphia, Pennsylvania, U.S.
126	Win	88–16–22	Charley Sieger	NWS	3	Jan 13, 1906	21 years, 302 days	Metropolitan A.C., New York City, New York, U.S.
125	Draw	87–16–22	Jimmy Briggs	NWS	6	Jan 1, 1906	21 years, 290 days	National A.C., Philadelphia, Pennsylvania, U.S.
124	Win	87–16–21	Charles Neary	PTS	8	Dec 8, 1905	21 years, 266 days	Panorama Building, Milwaukee, Wisconsin, U.S.
123	Win	86–16–21	Jack O'Leary	NWS	8	Nov 17, 1905	21 years, 245 days	Panorama Building, Milwaukee, Wisconsin, U.S.
122	Win	85–16–21	Young Corbett II	NWS	6	Oct 25, 1905	21 years, 222 days	Washington S.C., Philadelphia, Pennsylvania, U.S.
121	Win	84–16–21	Abe Attell	NWS	6	Oct 4, 1905	21 years, 201 days	National A.C., Philadelphia, Pennsylvania, U.S.
120	Win	83–16–21	Harry Lewis	NWS	6	Sep 7, 1905	21 years, 174 days	Broadway A.C., Philadelphia, Pennsylvania, U.S.
119	Win	82–16–21	Tim Callahan	NWS	6	Aug 31, 1905	21 years, 167 days	Broadway A.C., Philadelphia, Pennsylvania, U.S.
118	Win	81–16–21	Jack O'Neil	NWS	6	Aug 17, 1905	21 years, 153 days	Broadway A.C., Philadelphia, Pennsylvania, U.S.
117	Win	80–16–21	Harry Lewis	PTS	15	Aug 7, 1905	21 years, 143 days	Leiperville, Pennsylvania, U.S.
116	Draw	79–16–21	Sammy Smith	NWS	6	Jul 27, 1905	21 years, 132 days	Broadway A.C., Philadelphia, Pennsylvania, U.S.
115	Win	79–16–20	Abraham "Kid" Goodman	NWS	6	Jul 10, 1905	21 years, 115 days	National A.C., Philadelphia, Pennsylvania, U.S.
114	Win	78–16–20	Harry Lewis	PTS	10	Jun 20, 1905	21 years, 95 days	Leiperville, Pennsylvania, U.S.
113	Loss	77–16–20	Harry Lewis	NWS	6	May 27, 1905	21 years, 71 days	National A.C., Philadelphia, Pennsylvania, U.S.
112	Win	76–16–20	"Kid" Herman Landfield	NWS	6	May 19, 1905	21 years, 63 days	Knickerbocker A.C., Philadelphia, Pennsylvania, U.S.
111	Draw	75–16–20	"Kid" Herman Landfield	NWS	6	Apr 24, 1905	21 years, 38 days	Washington S.C., Philadelphia, Pennsylvania, U.S.
110	Win	75–16–19	Aurelio Herrera	NWS	6	Apr 15, 1905	21 years, 17 days	National A.C., Philadelphia, Pennsylvania, U.S.
109	Draw	74–16–19	Young Corbett II	NWS	6	Apr 3, 1905	21 years, 17 days	Washington S.C., Philadelphia, Pennsylvania, U.S.
108	Win	74–16–18	Jim Bonner	NWS	15	Mar 22, 1905	21 years, 5 days	Pottsville, Pennsylvania, U.S.
107	Win	73–16–18	Eddie McAvoy	NWS	6	Mar 17, 1905	21 years, 0 days	Kensington A.C., Philadelphia, Pennsylvania, U.S.
106	Win	72–16–18	Clarence Forbes	NWS	6	Feb 25, 1905	20 years, 345 days	National A.C., Philadelphia, Pennsylvania, U.S.
105	Win	71–16–18	Kid Sullivan	NWS	6	Feb 20, 1905	20 years, 340 days	Washington S.C., Philadelphia, Pennsylvania, U.S.
104	Win	70–16–18	Tim Callahan	NWS	6	Feb 16, 1905	20 years, 336 days	Broadway A.C., Philadelphia, Pennsylvania, U.S.
103	Win	69–16–18	Jimmy Kelly	KO	1 (6)	Feb 4, 1905	20 years, 324 days	Richmond A.C., Philadelphia, Pennsylvania, U.S.
102	Win	68–16–18	Jack O'Neil	NWS	6	Jan 26, 1905	20 years, 315 days	Broadway A.C., Philadelphia, Pennsylvania, U.S.
101	Win	67–16–18	William H. Smith	NWS	6	Jan 20, 1905	20 years, 309 days	Kensington A.C., Philadelphia, Pennsylvania, U.S.
100	Win	66–16–18	Tommy Coleman	NWS	6	Dec 31, 1904	20 years, 289 days	Richmond A.C., Philadelphia, Pennsylvania, U.S.
99	Win	65–16–18	Jim Bonner	NWS	6	Dec 26, 1904	20 years, 284 days	National A.C., Philadelphia, Pennsylvania, U.S.
98	Win	64–16–18	Johnny White	DQ	4 (6)	Dec 16, 1904	20 years, 274 days	Manhattan A.C., Philadelphia, Pennsylvania, U.S.
97	Win	63–16–18	Billy Willis	NWS	6	Dec 10, 1904	20 years, 268 days	Richmond A.C., Philadelphia, Pennsylvania, U.S.
96	Win	62–16–18	Tommy Coleman	NWS	6	Nov 26, 1904	20 years, 254 days	Richmond A.C., Philadelphia, Pennsylvania, U.S.
95	Loss	61–16–18	Abe Attell	PTS	20	Nov 19, 1904	20 years, 247 days	West End A.C., Saint Louis, Missouri, U.S.
94	Win	61–15–18	George Decker	NWS	6	Nov 12, 1904	20 years, 240 days	Richmond A.C., Philadelphia, Pennsylvania, U.S.
93	Win	60–15–18	Johnny Marto	NWS	6	Oct 18, 1904	20 years, 215 days	Manhattan A.C., Philadelphia, Pennsylvania, U.S.
92	Win	59–15–18	Billy Maharg	NWS	6	Oct 15, 1904	20 years, 212 days	Richmond A.C., Philadelphia, Pennsylvania, U.S.
91	Draw	58–15–18	Billy Maharg	PTS	10	Oct 13, 1904	20 years, 210 days	Mahanoy City, Pennsylvania, U.S.
90	Win	58–15–17	Tommy Coleman	NWS	6	Sep 24, 1904	20 years, 191 days	Richmond A.C., Philadelphia, Pennsylvania, U.S.
89	Win	57–15–17	George Decker	NWS	6	Sep 16, 1904	20 years, 183 days	Manhattan A.C., Philadelphia, Pennsylvania, U.S.
88	Win	56–15–17	Johnny Marto	NWS	6	Sep 3, 1904	20 years, 170 days	Richmond A.C., Philadelphia, Pennsylvania, U.S.
87	Win	55–15–17	George Walker	NWS	6	Aug 18, 1904	20 years, 154 days	Broadway A.C., Philadelphia, Pennsylvania, U.S.
86	Loss	54–15–17	Chester Goodwin	NWS	6	Aug 6, 1904	20 years, 142 days	National A.C., Philadelphia, Pennsylvania, U.S.
85	Win	54–14–17	Billy Kolb	NWS	6	Jul 1, 1904	20 years, 106 days	Manhattan A.C., Philadelphia, Pennsylvania, U.S.
84	Win	53–14–17	Johnny Marto	NWS	6	Jun 20, 1904	20 years, 95 days	National A.C., Philadelphia, Pennsylvania, U.S.
83	Win	52–14–17	Jimmy Devine	NWS	6	Jun 9, 1904	20 years, 84 days	Broadway A.C., Philadelphia, Pennsylvania, U.S.
82	Win	51–14–17	Johnny Marto	NWS	6	Jun 6, 1904	20 years, 81 days	National A.C., Philadelphia, Pennsylvania, U.S.
81	Loss	50–14–17	Johnny Marto	NWS	6	May 25, 1904	20 years, 69 days	National A.C., Philadelphia, Pennsylvania, U.S.
80	Loss	50–13–17	Abe Attell	NWS	6	May 14, 1904	20 years, 58 days	National A.C., Philadelphia, Pennsylvania, U.S.
79	Win	50–12–17	Young Donahue	NWS	6	Apr 16, 1904	20 years, 30 days	National A.C., Philadelphia, Pennsylvania, U.S.
78	Win	49–12–17	Young Donahue	NWS	6	Apr 9, 1904	20 years, 23 days	National A.C., Philadelphia, Pennsylvania, U.S.
77	Draw	48–12–17	Johnny Marto	NWS	6	Mar 25, 1904	20 years, 8 days	Lenox A.C., Philadelphia, Pennsylvania, U.S.
76	Draw	48–12–16	Abe Attell	NWS	6	Feb 27, 1904	19 years, 347 days	National A.C., Philadelphia, Pennsylvania, U.S.
75	Win	48–12–15	Tom O'Hara	NWS	6	Feb 15, 1904	19 years, 335 days	Lenox A.C., Philadelphia, Pennsylvania, U.S.
74	Loss	47–12–15	Tom O'Hara	NWS	6	Feb 5, 1904	19 years, 325 days	Lenox A.C., Philadelphia, Pennsylvania, U.S.
73	Win	47–11–15	Jack Lowery	NWS	6	Jan 30, 1904	19 years, 319 days	National A.C., Philadelphia, Pennsylvania, U.S.
72	Loss	46–11–15	Jimmy Devine	TKO	2 (6)	Dec 17, 1903	19 years, 275 days	Broadway A.C., Philadelphia, Pennsylvania, U.S.
71	Win	46–10–15	Willie Diddles	NWS	6	Dec 3, 1903	19 years, 261 days	Broadway A.C., Philadelphia, Pennsylvania, U.S.
70	Draw	45–10–15	George Hoey	NWS	6	Nov 21, 1903	19 years, 249 days	National A.C., Philadelphia, Pennsylvania, U.S.
69	Loss	45–10–14	Jack O'Neil	TKO	3 (6)	Oct 19, 1903	19 years, 216 days	National Hall, Chester, Pennsylvania, U.S.
68	Win	45–9–14	Jack O'Neil	NWS	6	Aug 20, 1903	19 years, 156 days	Broadway A.C., Philadelphia, Pennsylvania, U.S.
67	Win	44–9–14	Jack McClain	KO	1 (6)	Aug 6, 1903	19 years, 142 days	Broadway A.C., Chester, Pennsylvania, U.S.
66	Loss	43–9–14	Tommy Love	NWS	6	Jun 16, 1903	19 years, 91 days	Southern A.C., Philadelphia, Pennsylvania, U.S.
65	Draw	43–8–14	George Decker	NWS	6	May 28, 1903	19 years, 72 days	Broadway A.C., Philadelphia, Pennsylvania, U.S.
64	Win	43–8–13	Joe Mace	NWS	6	May 2, 1903	19 years, 46 days	Broadway A.C., Philadelphia, Pennsylvania, U.S.
63	Win	42–8–13	Tony Moran	NWS	6	Apr 23, 1903	19 years, 37 days	Broadway A.C., Philadelphia, Pennsylvania, U.S.
62	Loss	41–8–13	Abraham "Kid" Goodman	PTS	12	Apr 20, 1903	19 years, 34 days	West End A.C., Lawrence, Massachusetts, U.S.
61	Win	41–7–13	Jack Dorman	NWS	6	Apr 15, 1903	19 years, 29 days	National A.C., Philadelphia, Pennsylvania, U.S.
60	Win	40–7–13	Jack Dorman	NWS	6	Apr 9, 1903	19 years, 23 days	Broadway A.C., Philadelphia, Pennsylvania, U.S.
59	Draw	39–7–13	Billy Maharg	NWS	6	Mar 26, 1903	19 years, 9 days	Broadway A.C., Philadelphia, Pennsylvania, U.S.
58	Draw	39–7–12	Tony Moran	NWS	6	Feb 14, 1903	18 years, 334 days	National A.C., Philadelphia, Pennsylvania, U.S.
57	Win	39–7–11	Jimmy Simister	NWS	6	Jan 3, 1903	18 years, 292 days	National A.C., Philadelphia, Pennsylvania, U.S.
56	Win	38–7–11	Jimmy Simister	NWS	6	Dec 27, 1902	18 years, 285 days	National A.C., Philadelphia, Pennsylvania, U.S.
55	Win	37–7–11	Danny Brennan	NWS	6	Dec 14, 1902	18 years, 272 days	National A.C., Philadelphia, Pennsylvania, U.S.
54	Draw	36–7–11	Billy Maynard	NWS	6	Nov 29, 1902	18 years, 257 days	National A.C., Philadelphia, Pennsylvania, U.S.
53	Loss	36–7–10	Young Corbett II	NWS	6	Oct 27, 1902	18 years, 224 days	Washington S.C., Philadelphia, Pennsylvania, U.S.
52	Draw	36–6–10	Eddie Lenny	NWS	6	Oct 20, 1902	18 years, 217 days	Washington S.C., Philadelphia, Pennsylvania, U.S.
51	Win	36–6–9	Sammy Meyers	NWS	6	Oct 4, 1902	18 years, 201 days	National A.C., Philadelphia, Pennsylvania, U.S.
50	Draw	35–6–9	Billy Ryan	NWS	6	Sep 20, 1902	18 years, 187 days	National A.C., Philadelphia, Pennsylvania, U.S.
49	Draw	35–6–8	Sammy Smith	NWS	6	Sep 4, 1902	18 years, 171 days	Broadway A.C., Philadelphia, Pennsylvania, U.S.
48	Win	35–6–7	Joe "Buck" Kelly	NWS	6	Sep 2, 1902	18 years, 169 days	Knickerbocker A.C., Philadelphia, Pennsylvania, U.S.
47	Win	34–6–7	Cole Watson	NWS	6	Aug 28, 1902	18 years, 164 days	Broadway A.C., Philadelphia, Pennsylvania, U.S.
46	Loss	33–6–7	Sammy Smith	NWS	6	Aug 23, 1902	18 years, 159 days	National A.C., Philadelphia, Pennsylvania, U.S.
45	Win	33–5–7	Eddie Lenny	NWS	6	Aug 16, 1902	18 years, 152 days	National A.C., Philadelphia, Pennsylvania, U.S.
44	Win	32–5–7	Eddie Lenny	NWS	6	Aug 12, 1902	18 years, 148 days	National A.C., Philadelphia, Pennsylvania, U.S.
43	Loss	31–5–7	Billy Maharg	NWS	6	Aug 11, 1902	18 years, 147 days	Golden Gate A.C., Philadelphia, Pennsylvania, U.S.
42	Win	31–4–7	Eddie Lenny	DQ	5 (6)	Aug 4, 1902	18 years, 140 days	National A.C., Philadelphia, Pennsylvania, U.S.
41	Win	30–4–7	Kid Sullivan	NWS	6	Jul 28, 1902	18 years, 133 days	National A.C., Philadelphia, Pennsylvania, U.S.
40	Draw	29–4–7	Jimmy Simister	NWS	6	Jul 19, 1902	18 years, 124 days	Central A.C., Philadelphia, Pennsylvania, U.S.
39	Loss	29–4–6	Tim Callahan	NWS	6	Jul 3, 1902	18 years, 108 days	Broadway A.C., Philadelphia, Pennsylvania, U.S.
38	Loss	29–3–6	Billy Maynard	NWS	6	Apr 21, 1902	18 years, 35 days	Knickerbocker A.C., Philadelphia, Pennsylvania, U.S.
37	Win	29–2–6	Joe Fairburn	NWS	6	Apr 19, 1902	18 years, 33 days	National A.C., Philadelphia, Pennsylvania, U.S.
36	Win	28–2–6	John Loxley	NWS	6	Apr 12, 1902	18 years, 26 days	Knickerbocker A.C., Philadelphia, Pennsylvania, U.S.
35	Win	27–2–6	John Henry Johnson	NWS	6	Apr 8, 1902	18 years, 22 days	Penn Art Club, Philadelphia, Pennsylvania, U.S.
34	Win	26–2–6	Hugh Dougherty	NWS	6	Apr 5, 1902	18 years, 19 days	Knickerbocker A.C., Philadelphia, Pennsylvania, U.S.
33	Win	25–2–6	Hugh Dougherty	NWS	6	Mar 29, 1902	18 years, 12 days	Knickerbocker A.C., Philadelphia, Pennsylvania, U.S.
32	Draw	24–2–6	Cole Watson	NWS	6	Mar 26, 1902	18 years, 9 days	Penn Art Club, Philadelphia, Pennsylvania, U.S.
31	Win	24–2–5	Billy Maynard	NWS	6	Mar 22, 1902	18 years, 5 days	Knickerbocker A.C., Philadelphia, Pennsylvania, U.S.
30	Draw	23–2–5	Sammy Smith	NWS	6	Mar 19, 1902	18 years, 2 days	Penn Art Club, Philadelphia, Pennsylvania, U.S.
29	Win	23–2–4	Jimmy Simister	NWS	6	Mar 15, 1902	17 years, 363 days	Knickerbocker A.C., Philadelphia, Pennsylvania, U.S.
28	Win	22–2–4	Danny Casey	NWS	6	Mar 8, 1902	17 years, 356 days	Knickerbocker A.C., Philadelphia, Pennsylvania, U.S.
27	Win	21–2–4	Billy Burroughs	NWS	6	Mar 1, 1902	17 years, 349 days	Knickerbocker A.C., Philadelphia, Pennsylvania, U.S.
26	Win	20–2–4	Eddie Rocap	NWS	6	Feb 22, 1902	17 years, 342 days	Knickerbocker A.C., Philadelphia, Pennsylvania, U.S.
25	Loss	19–2–4	Patsy Donovan	NWS	6	Feb 18, 1902	17 years, 338 days	Nonpareil A.C., Philadelphia, Pennsylvania, U.S.
24	Win	19–1–4	Jack Lansing	NWS	6	Feb 15, 1902	17 years, 335 days	Knickerbocker A.C., Philadelphia, Pennsylvania, U.S.
23	Win	18–1–4	Jimmy O'Brien	KO	2 (6)	Feb 8, 1902	17 years, 328 days	Knickerbocker A.C., Philadelphia, Pennsylvania, U.S.
22	Win	17–1–4	George Decker	NWS	6	Feb 4, 1902	17 years, 324 days	West Philadelphia A.C., Philadelphia, Pennsylvania, U.S.
21	Draw	16–1–4	George Decker	NWS	6	Feb 3, 1902	17 years, 323 days	Knickerbocker A.C., Philadelphia, Pennsylvania, U.S.
20	Win	16–1–3	Charles Abramowitz	NWS	6	Jan 27, 1902	17 years, 316 days	Penn Art Club, Philadelphia, Pennsylvania, U.S.
19	Draw	15–1–3	Danny Cain	NWS	6	Jan 27, 1902	17 years, 316 days	Knickerbocker A.C., Philadelphia, Pennsylvania, U.S.
18	Win	15–1–2	Al Paxton	TKO	2 (6)	Jan 25, 1902	17 years, 314 days	Nonpareil A.C., Philadelphia, Pennsylvania, U.S.
17	Win	14–1–2	Muckles Muldoon	TKO	3 (6)	Jan 20, 1902	17 years, 309 days	Knickerbocker A.C., Philadelphia, Pennsylvania, U.S.
16	Win	13–1–2	John Henry Johnson	PTS	10	Jan 17, 1902	17 years, 306 days	Keystone A.C., Allentown, Pennsylvania, U.S.
15	Win	12–1–2	Fred Martin	KO	4 (6)	Jan 13, 1902	17 years, 302 days	Knickerbocker A.C., Philadelphia, Pennsylvania, U.S.
14	Win	11–1–2	Kid May	NWS	6	Jan 11, 1902	17 years, 300 days	Nonpareil A.C., Philadelphia, Pennsylvania, U.S.
13	Win	10–1–2	John Henry Johnson	NWS	6	Jan 6, 1902	17 years, 295 days	Knickerbocker A.C., Philadelphia, Pennsylvania, U.S.
12	Win	9–1–2	Young Kelly	NWS	6	Jan 4, 1902	17 years, 293 days	National A.C., Philadelphia, Pennsylvania, U.S.
11	Win	8–1–2	Young Marshall	NWS	6	Dec 30, 1901	17 years, 288 days	Knickerbocker A.C., Philadelphia, Pennsylvania, U.S.
10	Win	7–1–2	Tom O'Hara	NWS	6	Dec 23, 1901	17 years, 281 days	Knickerbocker A.C., Philadelphia, Pennsylvania, U.S.
9	Win	6–1–2	Spike Connolly	NWS	6	Dec 21, 1901	17 years, 279 days	National A.C., Philadelphia, Pennsylvania, U.S.
8	Win	5–1–2	Kid Garrett	NWS	6	Dec 16, 1901	17 years, 274 days	Knickerbocker A.C., Philadelphia, Pennsylvania, U.S.
7	Win	4–1–2	Young Marshall	KO	5 (6)	Dec 20, 1900	16 years, 278 days	Knickerbocker A.C., Philadelphia, Pennsylvania, U.S.
6	Win	3–1–2	Jack Rice	KO	5 (6)	Nov 29, 1900	16 years, 257 days	Knickerbocker A.C., Philadelphia, Pennsylvania, U.S.
5	Loss	2–1–2	Bobby Foster	NWS	4	Nov 15, 1900	16 years, 243 days	Knickerbocker A.C., Philadelphia, Pennsylvania, U.S.
4	Draw	2–0–2	George Decker	NWS	6	Nov 8, 1900	16 years, 236 days	Knickerbocker A.C., Philadelphia, Pennsylvania, U.S.
3	Win	2–0–1	Lew Barber	NWS	6	Oct 26, 1900	16 years, 223 days	Gray's Ferry A.C., Philadelphia, Pennsylvania, U.S.
2	Win	1–0–1	Tom Markey	KO	4 (6)	Sep 21, 1900	16 years, 188 days	Gray's Ferry A.C., Philadelphia, Pennsylvania, U.S.
1	Draw	0–0–1	Kid Egan	NWS	6	Jul 16, 1900	16 years, 121 days	Broadway A.C., Philadelphia, Pennsylvania, U.S.
