= Waldemar Holberg =

Danish boxer (1883–1947)

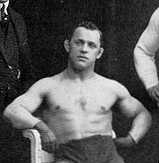

Personal information
- Nationality: Danish
- Born: Waldemar Birger Holberg; 29 May 1883 Copenhagen, Denmark
- Died: 16 March 1947 (aged 63) Vienna, Austria
- Height: 5 ft 5 in (1.65 m)
- Weight: Welterweight

Boxing career
- Stance: Orthodox

Boxing record
- Total fights: 70
- Wins: 39
- Win by KO: 28
- Losses: 27
- Draws: 4

Waldemar Birger Holberg (29 May 1883 – 16 March 1947) was a Danish boxer. Born in Copenhagen, he won the World Welterweight Championship on January 1, 1914, defeating Ray Bronson in Melbourne, Australia in a twenty round points decision. He was a fierce boxer with a KO percentage of 40% in the virtually complete boxing record displayed on BoxRec.

== Boxing career ==
Prior to his entry into the Olympics, Holberg was a five time amateur champion of Denmark. He won the featherweight division in 1902, and the lightweight division in 1903, 1905, 1907, and 1908. He qualified for the 1908 Summer Olympics, but was eliminated in the first round after losing to future welterweight world champion Matt Wells.

After the Olympics, Holberg turned professional making his debut in Denmark. He had a number of wins in Denmark and Germany but moved to England in 1912. After losing two bouts on disqualification, Holberg moved to Australia in 1913 fighting for the Australian lightweight title.

== Taking the Australian version of the world welterweight title ==
Ray Bronson

He had limited success in Australia, losing 6 out of 9 matches but on New Years Day, 1914 met American Ray Bronson in Melbourne in a bout recognized by the Australian boxing authorities as a World Welterweight title. Holberg won easily on points after 20 rounds. He held the title for only twenty-three days, losing it in Melbourne to Irishman Tom McCormick in a sixth round foul on January 24. By several accounts, Holberg sometimes fought with questionable tactics, and had lost five previous fights to fouls. For some reason, McCormick is more often recognized as a world welterweight boxing champion than Holberg.

After having lost the world title, he returned to Denmark only to lose two matches in Copenhagen to Danish veteran Dick Nelson on December 2, 1914, and February 14, 1915, one for the Scandinavian Welterweight title. Holberg had his last professional fight on August 29, 1921 when he was stopped in Vienna by Austrian Hans Hirschberger. Holberg retired from professional boxing in 1921 after his loss to Hirschberger.

== Professional boxing record ==
70 fights	39 wins	27 losses
By knockout	28	7
By decision	10	12
By disqualification	1	8
Draws	4	

No.	Result	Record	Opponent	Type	Round	Date	Location	Notes
70	Loss	39–27–4	Hans Hirschberger	TKO	9 (15)	Aug 29, 1921	Sportplatz, Vienna, Austria-Hungary	
69	Loss	39–26–4	Willi Spoeri	TKO	7 (10)	Jul 7, 1921	Sportplatz, Vienna, Austria-Hungary	
68	Win	39–25–4	Holger Hansen	PTS	12	Feb 22, 1921	Circus, Stockholm, Sweden	
67	Loss	38–25–4	Emanuel Jacobsen	DQ	5 (15)	Sep 13, 1919	Cirkus Variete, Copenhagen, Denmark	
66	Win	38–24–4	Johan Ekeroth	DQ	15 (20)	Aug 1, 1919	Copenhagen, Denmark	
65	Loss	37–24–4	Georg Brustad	PTS	15	May 26, 1919	Trondheim, Norway	
64	Win	37–23–4	Johan Ekeroth	PTS	10	Feb 2, 1919	Oslo, Norway	
63	Win	36–23–4	Holger Hansen	TKO	7 (?)	Dec 15, 1918	Oslo, Norway	
62	Win	35–23–4	Fred Boston	KO	6 (?)	Nov 2, 1918	Oslo, Norway	
61	Win	34–23–4	Dick Nelson	PTS	15	Apr 9, 1918	Turnhallen, Oslo, Norway	
60	Win	33–23–4	Frithjof Hansen	KO	3 (15)	Feb 26, 1918	Turnhallen, Oslo, Norway	
59	Win	32–23–4	Sam Brown	KO	11 (?)	Jan 22, 1918	Turnhallen, Oslo, Norway	
58	Win	31–23–4	Willy Carlsen	KO	2 (?)	Nov 18, 1917	Oslo, Norway	
57	Win	30–23–4	Johan Ekeroth	TKO	11 (?)	Jun 6, 1917	Oslo, Norway	
56	Win	29–23–4	Calle Svensson	TKO	7 (?)	Sep 24, 1916	Stockholm, Sweden	
55	Win	28–23–4	Calle Svensson	PTS	10	Sep 10, 1916	Stockholm, Sweden	
54	Win	27–23–4	Emil Kjellberg	TKO	7 (12)	Aug 11, 1916	Idrottsplatsen, Råsunda, Sweden	
53	Loss	26–23–4	Jack Kid Greenstock	PTS	10	Feb 21, 1916	Golders Green Hippodrome, Golders Green, London, England	
52	Loss	26–22–4	Willie Farrell	TKO	7 (15)	Jan 3, 1916	Hoxton Baths, Hoxton, London, England	
51	Loss	26–21–4	Willie Farrell	PTS	15	Oct 7, 1915	Liverpool Stadium, Pudsey Street, Liverpool, Merseyside, England	
50	Loss	26–20–4	Billy Williams	PTS	20	Jul 19, 1915	The Ring, Blackfriars Road, Southwark, London, England	
49	Loss	26–19–4	Jim Prendy	PTS	20	Jun 12, 1915	The Ring, Blackfriars Road, Southwark, London, England	
48	Loss	26–18–4	Dai Roberts	KO	7 (?)	Apr 24, 1915	London, England	Location unknown
47	Win	26–17–4	Young Nipper	PTS	10	Apr 12, 1915	The Ring, Blackfriars Road Matinee, Southwark, London, England	
46	Loss	25–17–4	Sapper McNeil	DQ	13 (?)	Mar 20, 1915	London, England	Location unknown
45	Loss	25–16–4	Dick Nelson	KO	15 (20)	Feb 14, 1915	Cirkus Bech-Olsen, Copenhagen, Denmark	
44	Loss	25–15–4	Dick Nelson	PTS	20	Dec 6, 1914	Cirkus Bech-Olsen, Copenhagen, Denmark	
43	Loss	25–14–4	Tom McCormick	DQ	6 (20)	Jan 24, 1914	Baker's Stadium, Melbourne, Victoria, Australia	Lost world welterweight title
42	Win	25–13–4	Ray Bronson	PTS	20	Jan 1, 1914	Baker's Stadium, Melbourne, Victoria, Australia	Won vacant world welterweight title
41	Loss	24–13–4	Alf Goodwin	DQ	14 (20)	Dec 20, 1913	Baker's Stadium, Melbourne, Victoria, Australia	
40	Win	24–12–4	Frank Picato	TKO	11 (20)	Nov 29, 1913	Baker's Stadium, Melbourne, Victoria, Australia	
39	Win	23–12–4	Len Porter	TKO	8 (20)	Nov 15, 1913	Baker's Stadium, Brisbane, Queensland, Australia	
38	Loss	22–12–4	Young Nipper	PTS	20	Nov 1, 1913	Sydney Stadium, Sydney, New South Wales, Australia	
37	Loss	22–11–4	Hock Keys	PTS	20	Oct 18, 1913	Olympic Stadium, Brisbane, Queensland, Australia	
36	Win	22–10–4	Harry Puie	KO	6 (20)	Oct 1, 1913	Baker's Stadium, Brisbane, Queensland, Australia	
35	Loss	21–10–4	Harry Thomas	DQ	20 (20)	Sep 13, 1913	Baker's Stadium, Brisbane, Queensland, Australia	
34	Loss	21–9–4	Herb McCoy	PTS	20	Aug 30, 1913	Sydney Stadium, Sydney, New South Wales, Australia	
33	Loss	21–8–4	Hughie Mehegan	KO	17 (20)	Jul 12, 1913	Sydney Stadium, Sydney, New South Wales, Australia	
32	Loss	21–7–4	Paul Brevieres	DQ	11 (?)	Dec 20, 1912	Élysée Montmartre, Paris, Paris, France	
31	Loss	21–6–4	Bill Johnson	DQ	11 (?)	Dec 16, 1912	Birmingham, West Midlands, England	
30	Loss	21–5–4	Bill Johnson	DQ	10 (?)	Nov 4, 1912	Sparkbrook Stadium, Birmingham, West Midlands, England	
29	Win	21–4–4	Jack Ward	KO	1 (?)	Sep 30, 1912	Birmingham, West Midlands, England	
28	Draw	20–4–4	Dick Lee	PTS	10	Aug 24, 1912	The Ring, Blackfriars Road, Southwark, London, England	
27	Loss	20–4–3	Dick Nelson	PTS	20	Jun 33, 1912	Cirkus Bech-Olsen, Copenhagen, Denmark	
26	Win	20–3–3	Bobby Dobbs	PTS	20	Feb 3, 1912	Vienna, Austria-Hungary	
25	Win	19–3–3	Jerry Peterson	KO	10 (?)	Dec 9, 1911	Vienna, Austria-Hungary	
24	Win	18–3–3	Billy Gordon	KO	15 (?)	Sep 17, 1911	Copenhagen, Denmark	
23	Win	17–3–3	Holger Hansen	KO	4 (?)	Sep 3, 1911	Copenhagen, Denmark	
22	Draw	16–3–3	Jack Slim	PTS	15	Aug 22, 1911	Berlin, Germany	
21	Win	16–3–2	Jimmy Butler	KO	4 (?)	Aug 20, 1911	Copenhagen, Denmark	
20	Win	15–3–2	Paul Mond	KO	4 (?)	Jul 23, 1911	Berlin, Germany	
19	Win	14–3–2	Kid McGordon	PTS	15	Apr 23, 1911	Vienna, Austria-Hungary	
18	Win	13–3–2	Eugen Legard	KO	7 (?)	Dec 19, 1910	Berlin, Germany	Location unknown
17	Win	12–3–2	Erik Mosuk	KO	2 (?)	Dec 15, 1910	Berlin, Germany	Location unknown
16	Win	11–3–2	H Paullian	KO	4 (?)	Dec 5, 1910	United States of America	Location unknown
15	Win	10–3–2	Alf Elreich	KO	6 (?)	Sep 12, 1910	Mannheim, Baden-Württemberg, Germany	
14	Win	9–3–2	M Lechleitner	KO	2 (?)	Sep 9, 1910	Mannheim, Baden-Württemberg, Germany	
13	Win	8–3–2	Alf Elreich	KO	4 (?)	Apr 7, 1910	Mannheim, Baden-Württemberg, Germany	
12	Win	7–3–2	M Muller	KO	3 (?)	Apr 28, 1910	Hamburg, Germany	
11	Win	6–3–2	E Van Dyk	KO	5 (?)	Feb 7, 1910	Location unknown	
10	Win	5–3–2	Billy Jackson	KO	5 (?)	Jan 27, 1910	Budapest, Austria-Hungary	
9	Loss	4–3–2	Dick Nelson	KO	5 (15)	Jun 25, 1909	Copenhagen, Denmark	
8	Win	4–2–2	Frank	KO	1 (?)	May 29, 1909	Copenhagen, Denmark	
7	Win	3–2–2	Emil Hemming Hansen	KO	5 (?)	May 29, 1909	Copenhagen, Denmark	
6	Draw	2–2–2	Holger Hansen	PTS	10	Apr 25, 1909	Copenhagen, Denmark	
5	Win	2–2–1	John Jordan	PTS	10	Feb 21, 1909	Copenhagen, Denmark	
4	Loss	1–2–1	Jim Smith	PTS	?	Dec 15, 1908	Copenhagen, Denmark	
3	Win	1–1–1	Johannes Hindsberg	PTS	?	Dec 5, 1908	Copenhagen, Denmark	
2	Draw	0–1–1	Holger Hansen	PTS	?	Dec 2, 1908	Copenhagen, Denmark	
1	Loss	0–1	Jim Smith	PTS	?	Dec 1, 1908	Copenhagen, Denmark	

== See also ==
- Lineal championship
- List of welterweight boxing champions

Achievements
Vacant Title last held by Mike "Twin" Sullivan	World Welterweight Champion; January 1, 1914 – January 24, 1914	Succeeded by Tom McCormick
