= Ray Bronson =

American boxer (1887–1948)

- Bronson in 1920

Personal information
- Nickname: John Ray Bronson
- Nationality: American
- Born: August 2, 1887 Webster City, Iowa, U.S.
- Died: January 1, 1948 (aged 60)
- Height: 5 ft 4 in (163 cm)
- Weight: Welterweight

Boxing career
- Stance: Orthodox

Boxing record
- Total fights: 105
- Wins: 61
- Win by KO: 22
- Losses: 19
- Draws: 25

Ray Bronson (August 1887 – January 1948) briefly claimed the World Welterweight Boxing Title between February and December 1912.

== Early life ==
Like many boxers of his era, Bronson began earning a living at an early age. After working as a messenger boy, he became an apprentice horseshoer in an Indianapolis blacksmith shop. As his strength developed, he was often assigned the task of shoeing the strongest and most difficult horses. His early work as a blacksmith strengthened his arms and shoulders and helped build endurance, all of which proved essential to his success as a boxer. He became a member of the Horseshoers’ Union in October 1905 and served as a delegate to the Central Labor Union through 1907.

== Early boxing career ==
At least according to BoxRec, Bronson had begun his professional boxing career by the age of seventeen in early 1905, and although the location of many of his early fights remains unclear, he fought often in his hometown of Indianapolis and occasionally in adjacent Illinois. In his first four years of boxing, he fought at least 44 fights, losing only twice in those bouts listed by BoxRec, once to Grover Hayes, and once to Mickey Ford, both in Indiana, and both by knockout.

In a memorable bout on March 5, 1909, he lost in a thirteenth-round TKO to the great Freddie Welsh in a lightweight bout in Gretna, Louisiana. On September 19, 1909, he drew with Packey McFarland on points in a full twenty-round bout in McDonoughville, Louisiana. The local New Orleans Daily Picayune gave the bout to McFarland, however. The Washington Evening Star called the bout "a hard, fast battle all the way", and noted that both boxers were near the lightweight limit, weighing in at around 134 pounds.

On June 30, 1910, Bronson managed to defeat future welterweight world champion Jack Britton at the Royal Athletic Club in New Orleans in a ten-round points decision.

== Claiming the World Welterweight Title ==
Bronson first claimed the World Welterweight Title, according to most sources, in his bout with Young Erne on February 22, 1912, in Indianapolis, Indiana. He won the bout, according to the Indianapolis Star in a ten-round points decision.

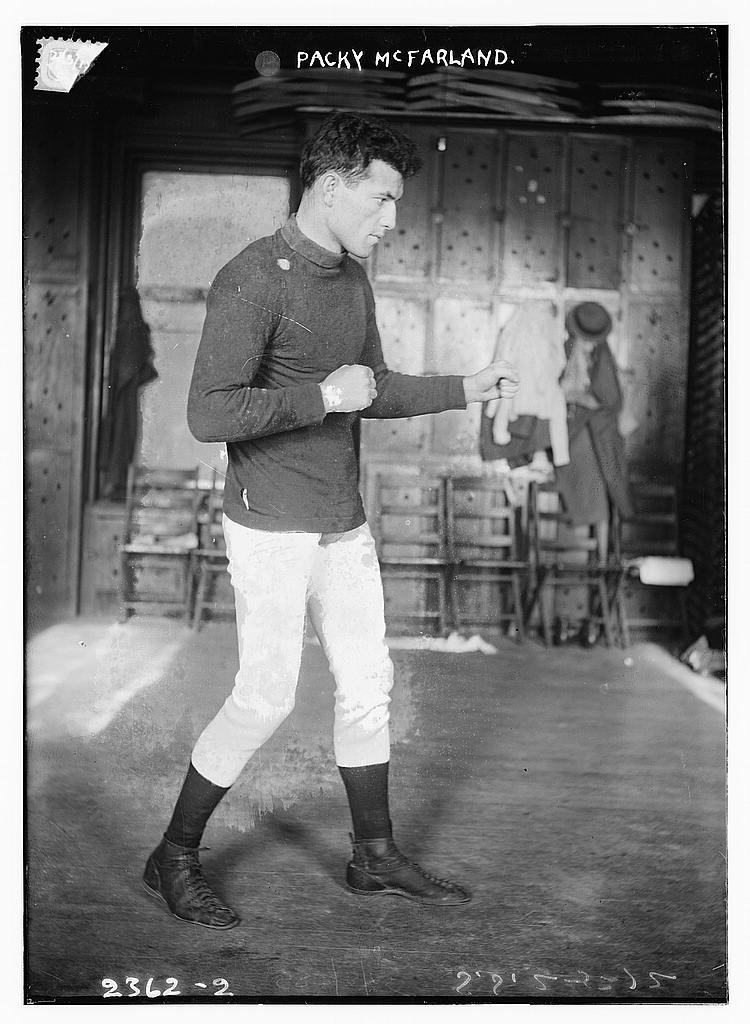
Packey McFarland, circa 1912

One of Bronson's most famous opponents was Packey McFarland. Bronson fought a ten-round, no-decision bout three months after taking the Welterweight Title against McFarland at Independence Hall in Indianapolis on May 29, 1912. Though a no-decision bout, most newspapers gave the edge to McFarland, an American boxing legend who somehow never claimed a world title despite being nearly undefeated in his career. A large crowd had assembled perhaps as a result of the Indianapolis 500 soon to follow. The Milwaukee Journal wrote, "Packey McFarland gave Ray Bronson an artistic lacing in a spiteful ten-round fight before a big crowd of fans." The New London Day wrote, "McFarland had the better of eight rounds, and Bronson managed to break even in the other two."

According to one source, Bronson was one of only two boxers to ever knock down the legendary Packey McFarland in a fight, a feat he managed in their previous 1909 twenty-round bout in New Orleans. As the fight was a no-decision, Bronson retained his title.

Bronson defended his title against boxers Clarence English, Harry Brewer, Wildcat Ferns and Hillard Lang. He lost the American version of the World title on January 13, 1913, to Spike Kelly in an eight-round points decision in Memphis, Tennessee. He more formally lost the World Title against Waldemar Holberg in Melbourne, Victoria, Australia on January 1, 1914, in a twenty-round points decision that wfi zizizizi zizi izi zizielterweight Milburn Saylor, and that, "Bronson has a number of crack battlers under his wing," which included Al Morey, an Australian welterweight.

== Retirement from boxing ==
Bronson retired from active professional boxing around 1921 and died in 1948.

== Professional boxing record ==
All information in this section is derived from BoxRec, unless otherwise stated.

=== Official record ===
| 105 fights | 49 wins | 10 losses |
|---|---|---|
| By knockout | 22 | 4 |
| By decision | 26 | 5 |
| By disqualification | 1 | 1 |
| Draws | 23 | |
| Newspaper decisions/draws | 23 | |

All newspaper decisions are officially regarded as “no decision” bouts and are not counted in the win/loss/draw column.

| No. | Result | Record | Opponent | Type | Round | Date | Location | Notes |
|---|---|---|---|---|---|---|---|---|
| 105 | Loss | 49–10–23 (23) | Jack Britton | NWS | 10 | Sep 6, 1920 | Cedar Point Arena, Sandusky, Ohio, U.S. | |
| 104 | Loss | 49–10–23 (22) | Matt Wells | TKO | 7 (20) | Feb 28, 1914 | Sydney Stadium, Sydney, New South Wales, Australia | |
| 103 | Draw | 49–9–23 (22) | Frank Picato | PTS | 20 | Feb 14, 1914 | Baker's Stadium, Brisbane, Queensland, Australia | |
| 102 | Loss | 49–9–22 (22) | Waldemar Holberg | PTS | 20 | Jan 1, 1914 | Baker's Pavilion, Melbourne, Victoria, Australia | Lost world welterweight title claim; For vacant Australian world welterweight title; Forbes continued to claim the title |
| 101 | Loss | 49–8–22 (22) | Young Denny | NWS | 10 | May 12, 1913 | Orleans A.C., New Orleans, Louisiana, U.S. | Bronson defended the American version of the world welterweight title |
| 100 | Win | 49–8–22 (21) | Hilliard Lang | NWS | 10 | Apr 23, 1913 | Auditorium, Indianapolis, Indiana, U.S. | |
| 99 | Draw | 49–8–22 (20) | Billy Griffith | NWS | 10 | Apr 14, 1913 | Olympic A.C., Cincinnati, Ohio, U.S. | |
| 98 | Loss | 49–8–22 (19) | Tommy Howell | NWS | 6 | Mar 8, 1913 | National A.C., Philadelphia, Pennsylvania, U.S. | |
| 97 | Win | 49–8–22 (18) | Leo Kelly | KO | 2 (8) | Mar 5, 1913 | Saint Louis, Missouri, U.S. | |
| 96 | Win | 48–8–22 (18) | Jimmy Perry | NWS | 10 | Jan 29, 1913 | Auditorium, Indianapolis, Indiana, U.S. | |
| 95 | Loss | 48–8–22 (17) | Tommy Howell | PTS | 10 | Jan 22, 1913 | Labor Temple Auditorium, Kansas City, Missouri, U.S. | |
| 94 | Loss | 48–7–22 (17) | Spike Kelly | PTS | 8 | Jan 13, 1913 | Phoenix A.C., Memphis, Tennessee, U.S. | Lost American welterweight title claim |
| 93 | Win | 48–6–22 (17) | Clarence English | NWS | 8 | Oct 29, 1912 | Saint Louis, Missouri, U.S. | |
| 92 | Loss | 48–6–22 (16) | Hilliard Lang | NWS | 12 | Sep 9, 1912 | Winnipeg, Manitoba, Canada | American welterweight title claim |
| 91 | Win | 48–6–22 (15) | Wildcat Ferns | NWS | 10 | Sep 2, 1912 | Auditorium, Indianapolis, Indiana, U.S. | |
| 90 | Win | 48–6–22 (14) | Harry Brewer | NWS | 10 | Jun 29, 1912 | Ball Park, Indianapolis, Indiana, U.S. | |
| 89 | Loss | 48–6–22 (13) | Packey McFarland | NWS | 10 | May 29, 1912 | Independence Ball Park, Indianapolis, Indiana, U.S. | American welterweight title claim |
| 88 | Loss | 48–6–22 (12) | Harry Brewer | NWS | 8 | May 23, 1912 | Coliseum, Saint Louis, Missouri, U.S. | American welterweight title claim |
| 87 | Win | 48–6–22 (11) | Clarence English | PTS | 15 | Apr 1, 1912 | Saint Joseph, Missouri, U.S. | Claimed vacant American welterweight title |
| 86 | Win | 47–6–22 (11) | Young Erne | NWS | 10 | Feb 22, 1912 | Auditorium, Indianapolis, Indiana, U.S. | |
| 85 | Draw | 47–6–22 (10) | Tommy Devlin | PTS | 10 | Jan 1, 1912 | Tri City A.C., Jeffersonville, Indiana, U.S. | |
| 84 | Win | 47–6–21 (10) | Tommy Howell | NWS | 10 | Nov 29, 1911 | Auditorium, Indianapolis, Indiana, U.S. | |
| 83 | Loss | 47–6–21 (9) | Milburn Saylor | NWS | 10 | Oct 18, 1911 | Auditorium, Indianapolis, Indiana, U.S. | |
| 82 | Win | 47–6–21 (8) | Tommy Howell | NWS | 10 | Sep 27, 1911 | Auditorium, Indianapolis, Indiana, U.S. | |
| 81 | Loss | 47–6–21 (7) | Tommy Howell | PTS | 12 | Aug 29, 1911 | Armory A.A., Boston, Massachusetts, U.S. | |
| 80 | Win | 47–5–21 (7) | Dave Deshler | NWS | 10 | Aug 23, 1911 | Auditorium, Indianapolis, Indiana, U.S. | |
| 79 | Win | 47–5–21 (6) | Eddie Webber | KO | 3 (10) | Jul 26, 1911 | Auditorium, Indianapolis, Indiana, U.S. | |
| 78 | Win | 46–5–21 (6) | Johnny Glover | PTS | 8 | Jul 10, 1911 | Memphis, Tennessee, U.S. | |
| 77 | Win | 45–5–21 (6) | Morris Bloom | NWS | 10 | Jun 5, 1911 | Empire Theater, Indianapolis, Indiana, U.S. | |
| 76 | Loss | 45–5–21 (5) | Sid Burns | DQ | 19 (20) | Mar 22, 1911 | Olympia Annexe, Kensington, London, England | |
| 75 | Win | 45–4–21 (5) | Jim Armstrong | KO | 5 (20) | Jan 23, 1911 | Melbourne Athletic Club, Melbourne, Victoria, Australia | |
| 74 | Win | 44–4–21 (5) | Arthur Douglas | TKO | 11 (20) | Jan 7, 1911 | Sydney Stadium, Sydney, New South Wales, Australia | |
| 73 | Loss | 43–4–21 (5) | Hughie Mehegan | PTS | 20 | Jan 2, 1911 | Sydney Stadium, Sydney, New South Wales, Australia | For vacant Australian lightweight title |
| 72 | Win | 43–3–21 (5) | Frank Thorn | TKO | 4 (20) | Dec 7, 1910 | Sydney Stadium, Sydney, New South Wales, Australia | |
| 71 | Win | 42–3–21 (5) | Sid Papworth Sullivan | PTS | 20 | Nov 16, 1910 | Sydney Stadium, Sydney, New South Wales, Australia | |
| 70 | Win | 41–3–21 (5) | Tommy Jones | PTS | 20 | Oct 22, 1910 | Brisbane Stadium, Brisbane, Queensland, Australia | |
| 69 | Win | 40–3–21 (5) | Grover Hayes | PTS | 8 | Aug 29, 1910 | Phoenix A.C., Memphis, Tennessee, U.S. | |
| 68 | Win | 39–3–21 (5) | Johnny Krause | PTS | 8 | Aug 1, 1910 | Memphis, Tennessee, U.S. | |
| 67 | Win | 38–3–21 (5) | Guy Dalton | PTS | 8 | Jul 26, 1910 | Richmond, Indiana, U.S. | |
| 66 | Win | 37–3–21 (5) | Jack Britton | PTS | 10 | Jun 30, 1910 | Royal A.C., New Orleans, Louisiana, U.S. | |
| 65 | Win | 36–3–21 (5) | Harry Trendall | PTS | 8 | Jun 13, 1910 | Memphis, Tennessee, U.S. | |
| 64 | Win | 35–3–21 (5) | Guy Dalton | KO | 5 (?) | Jun 8, 1910 | near Evansville, Indiana, U.S. | |
| 63 | Loss | 34–3–21 (5) | Jack Redmond | NWS | 10 | May 17, 1910 | Grand Opera House, Anderson, Indiana, U.S. | |
| 62 | Win | 34–3–21 (4) | Mike Memsic | NWS | 8 | May 5, 1910 | Anderson, Indiana, U.S. | |
| 61 | Draw | 34–3–21 (3) | Paul Kohler | NWS | 10 | May 2, 1910 | Akron, Ohio, U.S. | |
| 60 | Win | 34–3–21 (2) | Tommy O'Keefe | TKO | 3 (12) | Mar 22, 1910 | Armory, Boston, Massachusetts, U.S. | |
| 59 | Win | 33–3–21 (2) | Joe Hirst | NWS | 6 | Mar 12, 1910 | National A.C., Philadelphia, Pennsylvania, U.S. | |
| 58 | Draw | 33–3–21 (1) | Jack Dillon | PTS | 8 (10) | Mar 8, 1910 | Grand Opera House, Anderson, Indiana, U.S. | The referee declared it a draw in the 8th, although the bout was scheduled for 10 rounds |
| 57 | Draw | 33–3–20 (1) | Matty Baldwin | PTS | 12 | Feb 22, 1910 | Armory, Boston, Massachusetts, U.S. | |
| 56 | Draw | 33–3–19 (1) | Matty Baldwin | PTS | 20 | Dec 26, 1909 | West Side A.C., Gretna, Louisiana, U.S. | |
| 55 | Draw | 33–3–18 (1) | Dave Deshler | PTS | 12 | Dec 14, 1909 | Armory A.A., Boston, Massachusetts, U.S. | |
| 54 | Draw | 33–3–17 (1) | Dave Deshler | PTS | 12 | Nov 30, 1909 | Armory A.A., Boston, Massachusetts, U.S. | |
| 53 | Win | 33–3–16 (1) | Perry Moyer | KO | 1 (20) | Oct 16, 1909 | Near, Dayton, Ohio, U.S. | |
| 52 | Draw | 32–3–16 (1) | Packey McFarland | PTS | 20 | Sep 19, 1909 | West Side A.C., McDonoughville, Louisiana, U.S. | |
| 51 | Win | 32–3–15 (1) | Jack O'Sullivan | PTS | 6 | Aug 7, 1909 | Marion, Indiana, U.S. | |
| 50 | Win | 31–3–15 (1) | Jack Redmond | PTS | 10 | Jul 3, 1909 | Royal A.C., New Orleans, Louisiana, U.S. | |
| 49 | Draw | 30–3–15 (1) | Jack Redmond | PTS | 10 | Jun 26, 1909 | Royal A.C., New Orleans, Louisiana, U.S. | |
| 48 | Loss | 30–3–14 (1) | Cyclone Johnny Thompson | NWS | 6 | May 25, 1909 | Columbus, Ohio, U.S. | |
| 47 | Draw | 30–3–14 | Russell Van Horn | PTS | 10 | May 15, 1909 | Royal A.C., New Orleans, Louisiana, U.S. | |
| 46 | Draw | 30–3–13 | Jack Dillon | PTS | 6 | Mar 12, 1909 | Hartford City A.C., Hartford City, Indiana, U.S. | |
| 45 | Loss | 30–3–12 | Freddie Welsh | TKO | 13 (20) | Mar 5, 1909 | West Side A.C., Gretna, Louisiana, U.S. | |
| 44 | Win | 30–2–12 | Julius Stein | KO | 3 (20) | Jan 26, 1909 | Atlanta A.C., Atlanta, Georgia, U.S. | |
| 43 | Draw | 29–2–12 | Jimmy Dunn | PTS | 10 | Jan 22, 1909 | Auditorium, Indianapolis, Indiana, U.S. | |
| 42 | Win | 29–2–11 | Kid Goodman | PTS | 20 | Nov 20, 1908 | Gymnastic Club, Dayton, Ohio, U.S. | |
| 41 | Draw | 28–2–11 | Jimmy Dunn | PTS | 15 | Sep 7, 1908 | Springfield, Ohio, U.S. | |
| 40 | Draw | 28–2–10 | Andy Bezenah | PTS | 15 | Apr 23, 1908 | Springfield, Ohio, U.S. | |
| 39 | Win | 28–2–9 | Andy Bezenah | PTS | 10 | Mar 30, 1908 | Springfield, Ohio, U.S. | |
| 38 | Win | 27–2–9 | Kid Hogan | KO | 5 (?) | Feb 18, 1908 | Springfield, Ohio, U.S. | |
| 37 | Draw | 26–2–9 | Julius Stein | PTS | 10 | Oct 30, 1907 | Auditorium, Indianapolis, Indiana, U.S. | |
| 36 | Draw | 26–2–8 | Grover Hayes | PTS | 10 | May 8, 1907 | Indianapolis A.C., Indianapolis, Indiana, U.S. | |
| 35 | Win | 26–2–7 | Jack Ward | KO | 3 (?) | Apr 25, 1907 | Princess Rink, Fort Wayne, Indiana, U.S. | |
| 34 | Draw | 25–2–7 | Julius Stein | PTS | 10 | Apr 3, 1907 | Indianapolis, Indiana, U.S. | |
| 33 | Win | 25–2–6 | Mike Bartley | PTS | 10 | Mar 22, 1907 | Princess Rink, Fort Wayne, Indiana, U.S. | |
| 32 | Win | 24–2–6 | Johnny Nickels | KO | 3 (?) | Mar 20, 1907 | Auditorium, Indianapolis, Indiana, U.S. | |
| 31 | Win | 23–2–6 | Mickey Ford | PTS | 10 | Dec 12, 1906 | Auditorium, Indianapolis, Indiana, U.S. | |
| 30 | Win | 22–2–6 | Kid Kahn | KO | 5 (?) | Nov 27, 1906 | Bloomington, Indiana, U.S. | |
| 29 | Win | 21–2–6 | Louisville Tommy West | KO | 4 (6) | Oct 23, 1906 | Bloomington, Indiana, U.S. | |
| 28 | Win | 20–2–6 | Kid Black | PTS | 6 | Oct 22, 1906 | Auditorium, Indianapolis, Indiana, U.S. | |
| 27 | Draw | 19–2–6 | Freddie Cole | PTS | 6 | Oct 1, 1906 | Auditorium, Indianapolis, Indiana, U.S. | |
| 26 | Loss | 19–2–5 | Mickey Ford | KO | 7 (?) | Sep 29, 1906 | Kokomo, Indiana, U.S. | |
| 25 | Win | 19–1–5 | Mickey Ford | PTS | 6 | Aug 10, 1906 | Indianapolis, Indiana, U.S. | |
| 24 | Draw | 18–1–5 | Young Sharkey | PTS | 10 | Aug 8, 1906 | Urbana, Illinois, U.S. | |
| 23 | Loss | 18–1–4 | Grover Hayes | KO | 3 (3) | May 23, 1906 | Indianapolis, Indiana, U.S. | |
| 22 | Draw | 18–0–4 | Julius Stein | PTS | 8 | May 17, 1906 | Riverside A.C., Peoria, Illinois, U.S. | |
| 21 | Win | 18–0–3 | George Quinn | KO | 2 (?) | May 14, 1906 | Auditorium, Indianapolis, Indiana, U.S. | |
| 20 | Win | 17–0–3 | Grant Clark | KO | 4 (?) | Apr 23, 1906 | Indianapolis, Indiana, U.S. | |
| 19 | Win | 16–0–3 | Tommy Shea | KO | 2 (?) | Apr 9, 1906 | Indianapolis A.C., Indianapolis, Indiana, U.S. | |
| 18 | Win | 15–0–3 | Young Lavin | KO | 4 (?) | Mar 8, 1906 | Anderson, Indiana, U.S. | |
| 17 | Win | 14–0–3 | Mike Ryan | PTS | 6 | Mar 5, 1906 | Auditorium, Indianapolis, Indiana, U.S. | |
| 16 | Win | 13–0–3 | Ben Doerk | KO | 2 (?) | Feb 27, 1906 | Peoria A.C., Peoria, Illinois, U.S. | |
| 15 | Win | 12–0–3 | Jack Roberts | PTS | 6 | Feb 12, 1906 | Auditorium, Indianapolis, Indiana, U.S. | |
| 14 | Win | 11–0–3 | Tommy Grant | KO | 1 (?) | Jan 26, 1906 | Peoria A.C., Peoria, Illinois, U.S. | |
| 13 | Win | 10–0–3 | Willie Reilly | PTS | 4 | Jan 25, 1906 | Empire Theater, Indianapolis, Indiana, U.S. | |
| 12 | Draw | 9–0–3 | Canadian Kid | PTS | 6 | Dec 27, 1905 | Washington Club, Indianapolis, Indiana, U.S. | |
| 11 | Win | 9–0–2 | Canadian Kid | DQ | 3 (4) | Dec 11, 1905 | Auditorium, Indianapolis, Indiana, U.S. | |
| 10 | Win | 8–0–2 | Jack Metimas | PTS | 10 | Aug 18, 1905 | Brighton Beach, New York, U.S. | |
| 9 | Win | 7–0–2 | Kid Gordon | PTS | 5 | Aug 1, 1905 | United States of America | Exact date and location unknown |
| 8 | Win | 6–0–2 | Joe Percente | PTS | 10 | Jun 1, 1905 | United States of America | Exact date and location unknown |
| 7 | Win | 5–0–2 | Henry Gardner | PTS | 6 | May 1, 1905 | United States of America | Exact date and location unknown |
| 6 | Win | 4–0–2 | Skinny DeBruler | KO | 1 (4) | Apr 25, 1905 | Empire Theater, Indianapolis, Indiana, U.S. | |
| 5 | Draw | 3–0–2 | Skinny DeBruler | PTS | 6 | Apr 10, 1905 | Empire Theater, Indianapolis, Indiana, U.S. | |
| 4 | Win | 3–0–1 | Jimmy Casey | KO | 2 (5) | Mar 20, 1905 | Auditorium, Indianapolis, Indiana, U.S. | |
| 3 | Draw | 2–0–1 | Jimmy Casey | PTS | 4 | Mar 8, 1905 | Auditorium, Indianapolis, Indiana, U.S. | |
| 2 | Win | 2–0 | Mike Morris | PTS | 5 | Mar 1, 1905 | United States of America | Exact date and location unknown |
| 1 | Win | 1–0 | Billie Hinkle | PTS | 4 | Feb 20, 1905 | Auditorium, Indianapolis, Indiana, U.S. | |

=== Unofficial record ===
| 105 fights | 61 wins | 19 losses |
|---|---|---|
| By knockout | 22 | 4 |
| By decision | 38 | 14 |
| By disqualification | 1 | 1 |
| Draws | 25 | |

Record with the inclusion of newspaper decisions in the win/loss/draw column.

| No. | Result | Record | Opponent | Type | Round | Date | Location | Notes |
|---|---|---|---|---|---|---|---|---|
| 105 | Loss | 61–19–25 | Jack Britton | NWS | 10 | Sep 6, 1920 | Cedar Point Arena, Sandusky, Ohio, U.S. | |
| 104 | Loss | 61–18–25 | Matt Wells | TKO | 7 (20) | Feb 28, 1914 | Sydney Stadium, Sydney, New South Wales, Australia | |
| 103 | Draw | 61–17–25 | Frank Picato | PTS | 20 | Feb 14, 1914 | Baker's Stadium, Brisbane, Queensland, Australia | |
| 102 | Loss | 61–17–24 | Waldemar Holberg | PTS | 20 | Jan 1, 1914 | Baker's Pavilion, Melbourne, Victoria, Australia | Lost world welterweight title claim; For vacant Australian world welterweight title |
| 101 | Loss | 61–16–24 | Young Denny | NWS | 10 | May 12, 1913 | Orleans A.C., New Orleans, Louisiana, U.S. | Bronson defended the American version of the world welterweight title |
| 100 | Win | 61–15–24 | Hilliard Lang | NWS | 10 | Apr 23, 1913 | Auditorium, Indianapolis, Indiana, U.S. | |
| 99 | Draw | 60–15–24 | Billy Griffith | NWS | 10 | Apr 14, 1913 | Olympic A.C., Cincinnati, Ohio, U.S. | |
| 98 | Loss | 60–15–23 | Tommy Howell | NWS | 6 | Mar 8, 1913 | National A.C., Philadelphia, Pennsylvania, U.S. | |
| 97 | Win | 60–14–23 | Leo Kelly | KO | 2 (8) | Mar 5, 1913 | Saint Louis, Missouri, U.S. | |
| 96 | Win | 59–14–23 | Jimmy Perry | NWS | 10 | Jan 29, 1913 | Auditorium, Indianapolis, Indiana, U.S. | |
| 95 | Loss | 58–14–23 | Tommy Howell | PTS | 10 | Jan 22, 1913 | Labor Temple Auditorium, Kansas City, Missouri, U.S. | |
| 94 | Loss | 58–13–23 | Spike Kelly | PTS | 8 | Jan 13, 1913 | Phoenix A.C., Memphis, Tennessee, U.S. | Kelly claims the American welterweight title |
| 93 | Win | 58–12–23 | Clarence English | NWS | 8 | Oct 29, 1912 | Saint Louis, Missouri, U.S. | |
| 92 | Loss | 57–12–23 | Hilliard Lang | NWS | 12 | Sep 9, 1912 | Winnipeg, Manitoba, Canada | Retained American welterweight title claim |
| 91 | Win | 57–11–23 | Wildcat Ferns | NWS | 10 | Sep 2, 1912 | Auditorium, Indianapolis, Indiana, U.S. | |
| 90 | Win | 56–11–23 | Harry Brewer | NWS | 10 | Jun 29, 1912 | Ball Park, Indianapolis, Indiana, U.S. | |
| 89 | Loss | 55–11–23 | Packey McFarland | NWS | 10 | May 29, 1912 | Independence Ball Park, Indianapolis, Indiana, U.S. | Retained American welterweight title claim |
| 88 | Loss | 55–10–23 | Harry Brewer | NWS | 8 | May 23, 1912 | Coliseum, Saint Louis, Missouri, U.S. | Retained American welterweight title claim |
| 87 | Win | 55–9–23 | Clarence English | PTS | 15 | Apr 1, 1912 | Saint Joseph, Missouri, U.S. | Claimed vacant American welterweight title |
| 86 | Win | 54–9–23 | Young Erne | NWS | 10 | Feb 22, 1912 | Auditorium, Indianapolis, Indiana, U.S. | |
| 85 | Draw | 53–9–23 | Tommy Devlin | PTS | 10 | Jan 1, 1912 | Tri City A.C., Jeffersonville, Indiana, U.S. | |
| 84 | Win | 53–9–22 | Tommy Howell | NWS | 10 | Nov 29, 1911 | Auditorium, Indianapolis, Indiana, U.S. | |
| 83 | Loss | 52–9–22 | Milburn Saylor | NWS | 10 | Oct 18, 1911 | Auditorium, Indianapolis, Indiana, U.S. | |
| 82 | Win | 52–8–22 | Tommy Howell | NWS | 10 | Sep 27, 1911 | Auditorium, Indianapolis, Indiana, U.S. | |
| 81 | Loss | 51–8–22 | Tommy Howell | PTS | 12 | Aug 29, 1911 | Armory A.A., Boston, Massachusetts, U.S. | |
| 80 | Win | 51–7–22 | Dave Deshler | NWS | 10 | Aug 23, 1911 | Auditorium, Indianapolis, Indiana, U.S. | |
| 79 | Win | 50–7–22 | Eddie Webber | KO | 3 (10) | Jul 26, 1911 | Auditorium, Indianapolis, Indiana, U.S. | |
| 78 | Win | 49–7–22 | Johnny Glover | PTS | 8 | Jul 10, 1911 | Memphis, Tennessee, U.S. | |
| 77 | Win | 48–7–22 | Morris Bloom | NWS | 10 | Jun 5, 1911 | Empire Theater, Indianapolis, Indiana, U.S. | |
| 76 | Loss | 47–7–22 | Sid Burns | DQ | 19 (20) | Mar 22, 1911 | Olympia Annexe, Kensington, London, England | |
| 75 | Win | 47–6–22 | Jim Armstrong | KO | 5 (20) | Jan 23, 1911 | Melbourne Athletic Club, Melbourne, Victoria, Australia | |
| 74 | Win | 46–6–22 | Arthur Douglas | TKO | 11 (20) | Jan 7, 1911 | Sydney Stadium, Sydney, New South Wales, Australia | |
| 73 | Loss | 45–6–22 | Hughie Mehegan | PTS | 20 | Jan 2, 1911 | Sydney Stadium, Sydney, New South Wales, Australia | For vacant Australian lightweight title |
| 72 | Win | 45–5–22 | Frank Thorn | TKO | 4 (20) | Dec 7, 1910 | Sydney Stadium, Sydney, New South Wales, Australia | |
| 71 | Win | 44–5–22 | Sid Papworth Sullivan | PTS | 20 | Nov 16, 1910 | Sydney Stadium, Sydney, New South Wales, Australia | |
| 70 | Win | 43–5–22 | Tommy Jones | PTS | 20 | Oct 22, 1910 | Brisbane Stadium, Brisbane, Queensland, Australia | |
| 69 | Win | 42–5–22 | Grover Hayes | PTS | 8 | Aug 29, 1910 | Phoenix A.C., Memphis, Tennessee, U.S. | |
| 68 | Win | 41–5–22 | Johnny Krause | PTS | 8 | Aug 1, 1910 | Memphis, Tennessee, U.S. | |
| 67 | Win | 40–5–22 | Guy Dalton | PTS | 8 | Jul 26, 1910 | Richmond, Indiana, U.S. | |
| 66 | Win | 39–5–22 | Jack Britton | PTS | 10 | Jun 30, 1910 | Royal A.C., New Orleans, Louisiana, U.S. | |
| 65 | Win | 38–5–22 | Harry Trendall | PTS | 8 | Jun 13, 1910 | Memphis, Tennessee, U.S. | |
| 64 | Win | 37–5–22 | Guy Dalton | KO | 5 (?) | Jun 8, 1910 | near Evansville, Indiana, U.S. | |
| 63 | Loss | 36–5–22 | Jack Redmond | NWS | 10 | May 17, 1910 | Grand Opera House, Anderson, Indiana, U.S. | |
| 62 | Win | 36–4–22 | Mike Memsic | NWS | 8 | May 5, 1910 | Anderson, Indiana, U.S. | |
| 61 | Draw | 35–4–22 | Paul Kohler | NWS | 10 | May 2, 1910 | Akron, Ohio, U.S. | |
| 60 | Win | 35–4–21 | Tommy O'Keefe | TKO | 3 (12) | Mar 22, 1910 | Armory, Boston, Massachusetts, U.S. | |
| 59 | Win | 34–4–21 | Joe Hirst | NWS | 6 | Mar 12, 1910 | National A.C., Philadelphia, Pennsylvania, U.S. | |
| 58 | Draw | 33–4–21 | Jack Dillon | PTS | 8 (10) | Mar 8, 1910 | Grand Opera House, Anderson, Indiana, U.S. | The referee declared it a draw in the 8th, although the bout was scheduled for 10 rounds |
| 57 | Draw | 33–4–20 | Matty Baldwin | PTS | 12 | Feb 22, 1910 | Armory, Boston, Massachusetts, U.S. | |
| 56 | Draw | 33–4–19 | Matty Baldwin | PTS | 20 | Dec 26, 1909 | West Side A.C., Gretna, Louisiana, U.S. | |
| 55 | Draw | 33–4–18 | Dave Deshler | PTS | 12 | Dec 14, 1909 | Armory A.A., Boston, Massachusetts, U.S. | |
| 54 | Draw | 33–4–17 | Dave Deshler | PTS | 12 | Nov 30, 1909 | Armory A.A., Boston, Massachusetts, U.S. | |
| 53 | Win | 33–4–16 | Perry Moyer | KO | 1 (20) | Oct 16, 1909 | Near, Dayton, Ohio, U.S. | |
| 52 | Draw | 32–4–16 | Packey McFarland | PTS | 20 | Sep 19, 1909 | West Side A.C., McDonoughville, Louisiana, U.S. | |
| 51 | Win | 32–4–15 | Jack O'Sullivan | PTS | 6 | Aug 7, 1909 | Marion, Indiana, U.S. | |
| 50 | Win | 31–4–15 | Jack Redmond | PTS | 10 | Jul 3, 1909 | Royal A.C., New Orleans, Louisiana, U.S. | |
| 49 | Draw | 30–4–15 | Jack Redmond | PTS | 10 | Jun 26, 1909 | Royal A.C., New Orleans, Louisiana, U.S. | |
| 48 | Loss | 30–4–14 | Cyclone Johnny Thompson | NWS | 6 | May 25, 1909 | Columbus, Ohio, U.S. | |
| 47 | Draw | 30–3–14 | Russell Van Horn | PTS | 10 | May 15, 1909 | Royal A.C., New Orleans, Louisiana, U.S. | |
| 46 | Draw | 30–3–13 | Jack Dillon | PTS | 6 | Mar 12, 1909 | Hartford City A.C., Hartford City, Indiana, U.S. | |
| 45 | Loss | 30–3–12 | Freddie Welsh | TKO | 13 (20) | Mar 5, 1909 | West Side A.C., Gretna, Louisiana, U.S. | |
| 44 | Win | 30–2–12 | Julius Stein | KO | 3 (20) | Jan 26, 1909 | Atlanta A.C., Atlanta, Georgia, U.S. | |
| 43 | Draw | 29–2–12 | Jimmy Dunn | PTS | 10 | Jan 22, 1909 | Auditorium, Indianapolis, Indiana, U.S. | |
| 42 | Win | 29–2–11 | Kid Goodman | PTS | 20 | Nov 20, 1908 | Gymnastic Club, Dayton, Ohio, U.S. | |
| 41 | Draw | 28–2–11 | Jimmy Dunn | PTS | 15 | Sep 7, 1908 | Springfield, Ohio, U.S. | |
| 40 | Draw | 28–2–10 | Andy Bezenah | PTS | 15 | Apr 23, 1908 | Springfield, Ohio, U.S. | |
| 39 | Win | 28–2–9 | Andy Bezenah | PTS | 10 | Mar 30, 1908 | Springfield, Ohio, U.S. | |
| 38 | Win | 27–2–9 | Kid Hogan | KO | 5 (?) | Feb 18, 1908 | Springfield, Ohio, U.S. | |
| 37 | Draw | 26–2–9 | Julius Stein | PTS | 10 | Oct 30, 1907 | Auditorium, Indianapolis, Indiana, U.S. | |
| 36 | Draw | 26–2–8 | Grover Hayes | PTS | 10 | May 8, 1907 | Indianapolis A.C., Indianapolis, Indiana, U.S. | |
| 35 | Win | 26–2–7 | Jack Ward | KO | 3 (?) | Apr 25, 1907 | Princess Rink, Fort Wayne, Indiana, U.S. | |
| 34 | Draw | 25–2–7 | Julius Stein | PTS | 10 | Apr 3, 1907 | Indianapolis, Indiana, U.S. | |
| 33 | Win | 25–2–6 | Mike Bartley | PTS | 10 | Mar 22, 1907 | Princess Rink, Fort Wayne, Indiana, U.S. | |
| 32 | Win | 24–2–6 | Johnny Nickels | KO | 3 (?) | Mar 20, 1907 | Auditorium, Indianapolis, Indiana, U.S. | |
| 31 | Win | 23–2–6 | Mickey Ford | PTS | 10 | Dec 12, 1906 | Auditorium, Indianapolis, Indiana, U.S. | |
| 30 | Win | 22–2–6 | Kid Kahn | KO | 5 (?) | Nov 27, 1906 | Bloomington, Indiana, U.S. | |
| 29 | Win | 21–2–6 | Louisville Tommy West | KO | 4 (6) | Oct 23, 1906 | Bloomington, Indiana, U.S. | |
| 28 | Win | 20–2–6 | Kid Black | PTS | 6 | Oct 22, 1906 | Auditorium, Indianapolis, Indiana, U.S. | |
| 27 | Draw | 19–2–6 | Freddie Cole | PTS | 6 | Oct 1, 1906 | Auditorium, Indianapolis, Indiana, U.S. | |
| 26 | Loss | 19–2–5 | Mickey Ford | KO | 7 (?) | Sep 29, 1906 | Kokomo, Indiana, U.S. | |
| 25 | Win | 19–1–5 | Mickey Ford | PTS | 6 | Aug 10, 1906 | Indianapolis, Indiana, U.S. | |
| 24 | Draw | 18–1–5 | Young Sharkey | PTS | 10 | Aug 8, 1906 | Urbana, Illinois, U.S. | |
| 23 | Loss | 18–1–4 | Grover Hayes | KO | 3 (3) | May 23, 1906 | Indianapolis, Indiana, U.S. | |
| 22 | Draw | 18–0–4 | Julius Stein | PTS | 8 | May 17, 1906 | Riverside A.C., Peoria, Illinois, U.S. | |
| 21 | Win | 18–0–3 | George Quinn | KO | 2 (?) | May 14, 1906 | Auditorium, Indianapolis, Indiana, U.S. | |
| 20 | Win | 17–0–3 | Grant Clark | KO | 4 (?) | Apr 23, 1906 | Indianapolis, Indiana, U.S. | |
| 19 | Win | 16–0–3 | Tommy Shea | KO | 2 (?) | Apr 9, 1906 | Indianapolis A.C., Indianapolis, Indiana, U.S. | |
| 18 | Win | 15–0–3 | Young Lavin | KO | 4 (?) | Mar 8, 1906 | Anderson, Indiana, U.S. | |
| 17 | Win | 14–0–3 | Mike Ryan | PTS | 6 | Mar 5, 1906 | Auditorium, Indianapolis, Indiana, U.S. | |
| 16 | Win | 13–0–3 | Ben Doerk | KO | 2 (?) | Feb 27, 1906 | Peoria A.C., Peoria, Illinois, U.S. | |
| 15 | Win | 12–0–3 | Jack Roberts | PTS | 6 | Feb 12, 1906 | Auditorium, Indianapolis, Indiana, U.S. | |
| 14 | Win | 11–0–3 | Tommy Grant | KO | 1 (?) | Jan 26, 1906 | Peoria A.C., Peoria, Illinois, U.S. | |
| 13 | Win | 10–0–3 | Willie Reilly | PTS | 4 | Jan 25, 1906 | Empire Theater, Indianapolis, Indiana, U.S. | |
| 12 | Draw | 9–0–3 | Canadian Kid | PTS | 6 | Dec 27, 1905 | Washington Club, Indianapolis, Indiana, U.S. | |
| 11 | Win | 9–0–2 | Canadian Kid | DQ | 3 (4) | Dec 11, 1905 | Auditorium, Indianapolis, Indiana, U.S. | |
| 10 | Win | 8–0–2 | Jack Metimas | PTS | 10 | Aug 18, 1905 | Brighton Beach, New York, U.S. | |
| 9 | Win | 7–0–2 | Kid Gordon | PTS | 5 | Aug 1, 1905 | United States of America | Exact date and location unknown |
| 8 | Win | 6–0–2 | Joe Percente | PTS | 10 | Jun 1, 1905 | United States of America | Exact date and location unknown |
| 7 | Win | 5–0–2 | Henry Gardner | PTS | 6 | May 1, 1905 | United States of America | Exact date and location unknown |
| 6 | Win | 4–0–2 | Skinny DeBruler | KO | 1 (4) | Apr 25, 1905 | Empire Theater, Indianapolis, Indiana, U.S. | |
| 5 | Draw | 3–0–2 | Skinny DeBruler | PTS | 6 | Apr 10, 1905 | Empire Theater, Indianapolis, Indiana, U.S. | |
| 4 | Win | 3–0–1 | Jimmy Casey | KO | 2 (5) | Mar 20, 1905 | Auditorium, Indianapolis, Indiana, U.S. | |
| 3 | Draw | 2–0–1 | Jimmy Casey | PTS | 4 | Mar 8, 1905 | Auditorium, Indianapolis, Indiana, U.S. | |
| 2 | Win | 2–0 | Mike Morris | PTS | 5 | Mar 1, 1905 | United States of America | Exact date and location unknown |
| 1 | Win | 1–0 | Billie Hinkle | PTS | 4 | Feb 20, 1905 | Auditorium, Indianapolis, Indiana, U.S. | |
