= Jack Britton =

American boxer (1885–1962)

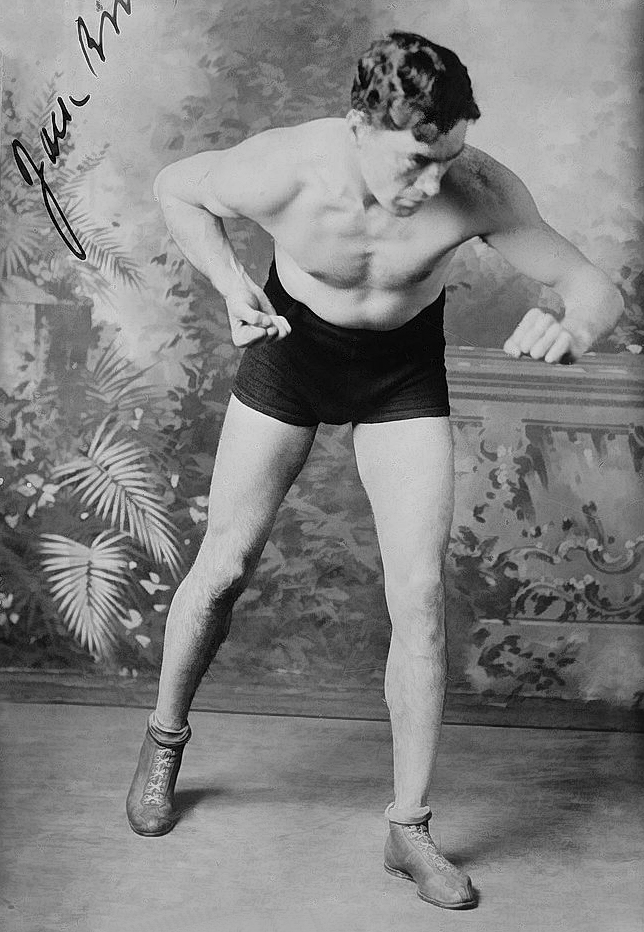

Personal information
- Nickname: Boxing Marvel
- Born: October 14, 1885 Clinton, New York, U.S.
- Died: March 27, 1962 (aged 76)
- Height: 5 ft 8 in (1.73 m)
- Weight: Welterweight

Boxing career
- Reach: 70 in (178 cm)
- Stance: Orthodox

Boxing record
- Total fights: 345; With the inclusion of newspaper decisions
- Wins: 237
- Win by KO: 30
- Losses: 60
- Draws: 43
- No contests: 5

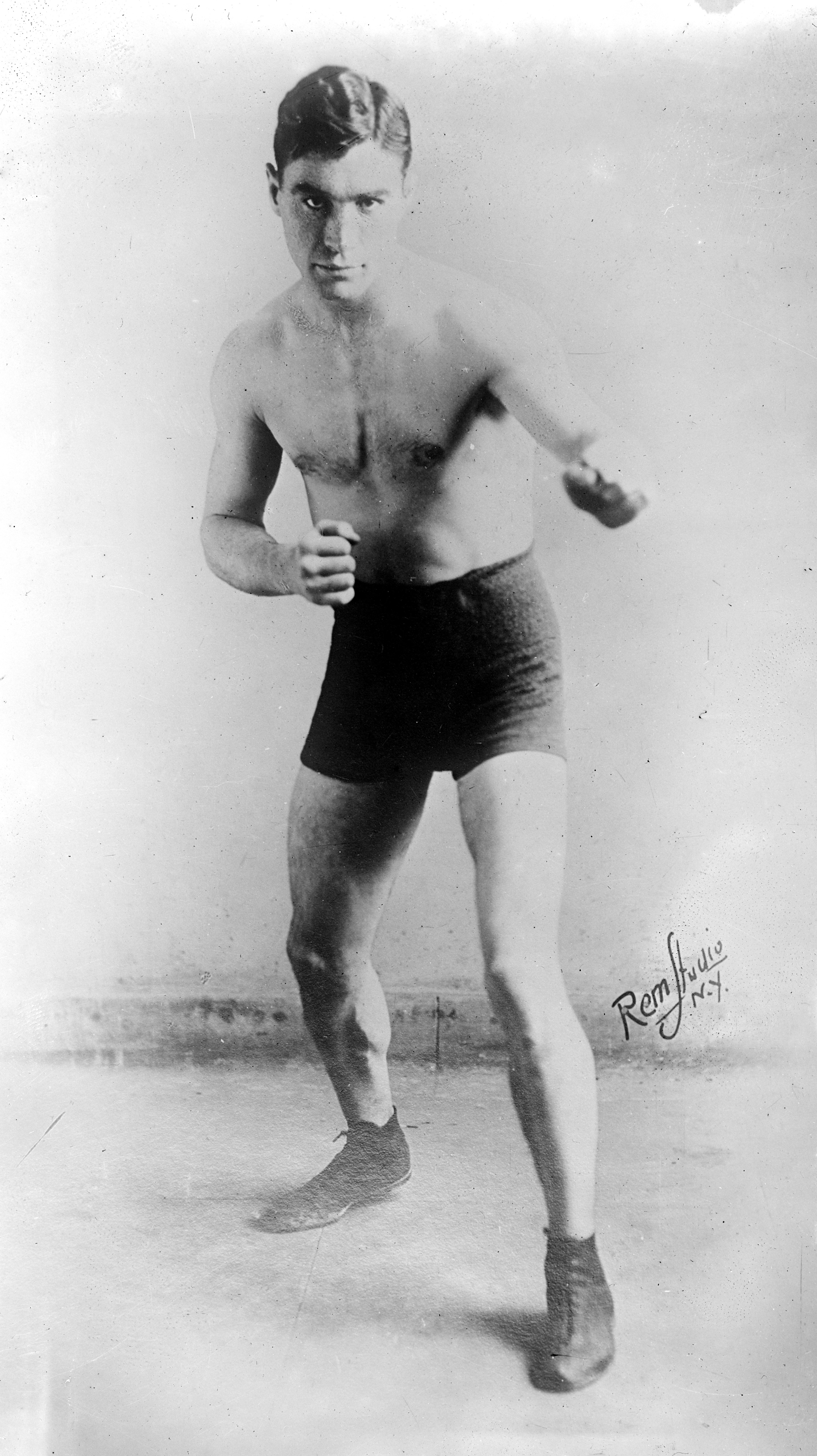
portrait of Britton

Jack Britton (October 14, 1885 – March 27, 1962) was an American boxer who was the first three-time world welterweight boxing champion. Born William J. Breslin in Clinton, New York, his professional career lasted for 25 years beginning in 1905. He holds the world record for the number of title bouts fought in a career with 37 (18 of which ended in no decisions), many against his arch-rival Ted "Kid" Lewis, against whom he fought 20 times. Statistical boxing website BoxRec lists Britton as the No. 6 ranked welterweight of all time while The Ring Magazine founder Nat Fleischer placed him at No. 3. He was inducted into the Ring Magazine Hall of Fame in 1960 and the International Boxing Hall of Fame as a first-class member in 1990.

Ernest Hemingway's short story "Fifty Grand" is based on the Jack Britton/Mickey Walker fight in Madison Square Garden on November 1, 1922. Other sources, like the famous writer of boxing, Budd Schulberg, link this story to the Britton/Benny Leonard fight the previous June in the Bronx Hippodrome where Leonard lost in what appeared to be an intentional foul. Leonard was specifically mentioned in the first draft of Hemingway's short story.

== World Welterweight Title Defense Against Benny Leonard ==
"This fight is one of the most controversial in the history of the ring, as shown by a reading of about fifteen accounts by New York sportswriters (supplied by Jack Kincaid). The writers were unanimous in having Britton well ahead after twelve fast rounds. He had crowded Leonard, cleverly outboxed him, and even marked him up. Leonard did have a good round eleven, staggering Britton twice, but Jack had a big 12th. In the 13th, Leonard landed a left to Britton's body which caused him to gasp, folding his hands over his mid-section, and go down to his knees. Jack seemed to claim a foul (although he said afterward that he didn't), but Referee Patsy Haley disallowed the claim. Britton came up to one knee and Leonard rushed in and struck him a light blow, causing the referee to disqualify Benny. Leonard claimed that this final blow was not a foul, but none of the reporters agreed. The reporters, who included Damon Runyon, Sid Mercer, Hype Igoe, W.R. McGeehan, and George Underwood, drew various conclusions about the ending. Some thought that the conclusion was staged, others did not. The spectators seemed inclined to believe that something had been put over on them, but perhaps the best approach is to take the result at face value."

== Professional boxing record ==
All information in this section is derived from BoxRec, unless otherwise stated.

=== Official record ===
345 fights	104 wins	29 losses
By knockout	30	1
By decision	72	26
By disqualification	2	2
Draws	20	
No contests	5	
Newspaper decisions/draws	187	

All newspaper decisions are officially regarded as "no decision" bouts and are not counted in the win/loss/draw column.

No.	Result	Record	Opponent	Type	Round, time	Date	Age	Location	Notes
345	Loss	104–29–20 (2) (190)	Rudy Marshall	PTS	10	Jul 29, 1930	44 years, 288 days	Beckley Avenue Arena, Stamford, Connecticut, U.S.	
344	Win	104–28–20 (2) (190)	Bobby Ruffalo	PTS	8	May 8, 1930	44 years, 206 days	Columbus Hall, Yonkers, New York, U.S.	
343	Win	103–28–20 (2) (190)	Alf Schell	PTS	10	Mar 6, 1930	44 years, 143 days	Foot Guard Hall, Hartford, Connecticut, U.S.	
342	Win	102–28–20 (2) (190)	Ralph Hood	PTS	10	Jan 20, 1930	44 years, 98 days	Roanoke Auditorium, Roanoke, Virginia, U.S.	
341	Loss	101–28–20 (2) (190)	Farmer Joe Cooper	PTS	10	Dec 17, 1929	44 years, 64 days	Armory, Charlotte, North Carolina, U.S.	
340	Loss	101–27–20 (2) (190)	Sam Bruce	PTS	6	Dec 6, 1929	44 years, 53 days	Broadway Auditorium, Buffalo, New York, U.S.	
339	Loss	101–26–20 (2) (190)	Elmer Bezenah	NWS	6	Oct 19, 1929	44 years, 5 days	Ohio National Guard Armory, Cincinnati, Ohio, U.S.	
338	Draw	101–26–20 (2) (189)	Frankie Palmo	PTS	10	Oct 14, 1929	44 years, 0 days	Baesman Hall, Portsmouth, Ohio, U.S.	
337	Loss	101–26–19 (2) (189)	Johnny Roberts	SD	10	Sep 30, 1929	43 years, 351 days	Baesman Hall, Portsmouth, Ohio, U.S.	
336	Draw	101–25–19 (2) (189)	George Gibbons	PTS	6	Sep 2, 1929	43 years, 323 days	Kenton, Ohio, U.S.	
335	Loss	101–25–18 (2) (189)	Henry Firpo	UD	10	Aug 21, 1929	43 years, 311 days	Weller Theater, Zanesville, Ohio, U.S.	
334	Loss	101–24–18 (2) (189)	Morrie Sherman	PTS	10	Aug 19, 1929	43 years, 309 days	Ramona Baseball Park, Grand Rapids, Michigan, U.S.	
333	Loss	101–23–18 (2) (189)	Ham Jenkins	PTS	10	Jul 9, 1929	43 years, 268 days	Olympic A.C., Denver, Colorado, U.S.	
332	Win	101–22–18 (2) (189)	Patsy Pollock	PTS	10	Jun 24, 1929	43 years, 253 days	Logan Square Baseball Park, Chicago, Illinois, U.S.	
331	Win	100–22–18 (2) (189)	Billy Brown	PTS	12	Jun 10, 1929	43 years, 239 days	Coliseum Arena, New Orleans, Louisiana, U.S.	
330	Loss	99–22–18 (2) (189)	James Red Herring	PTS	8	Apr 22, 1929	43 years, 190 days	Stadium, Memphis, Tennessee, U.S.	
329	Win	99–21–18 (2) (189)	Tot Wilson	PTS	10	Apr 12, 1929	43 years, 180 days	Macon, Georgia, U.S.	
328	Win	98–21–18 (2) (189)	Grover Mallini	PTS	10	Apr 8, 1929	43 years, 176 days	Mobile, Alabama, U.S.	
327	Win	97–21–18 (2) (189)	Ted Goodrich	PTS	10	Apr 4, 1929	43 years, 172 days	Auditorium, Atlanta, Georgia, U.S.	
326	Win	96–21–18 (2) (189)	Farmer Joe Cooper	PTS	10	Mar 22, 1929	43 years, 159 days	Coliseum Arena, New Orleans, Louisiana, U.S.	
325	Win	95–21–18 (2) (189)	Spike Webb	PTS	10	Feb 26, 1929	43 years, 135 days	Biscayne Arena, Miami, Florida, U.S.	
324	Win	94–21–18 (2) (189)	Cliff Wellons	PTS	10	Feb 20, 1929	43 years, 129 days	Biscayne Arena, Miami, Florida, U.S.	
323	Win	93–21–18 (2) (189)	Canada Lee	PTS	10	Dec 20, 1928	43 years, 67 days	Boston Garden, Boston, Massachusetts, U.S.	
322	Loss	92–21–18 (2) (189)	Frankie O'Brien	PTS	10	Dec 7, 1928	43 years, 54 days	Boston Garden, Boston, Massachusetts, U.S.	
321	Win	92–20–18 (2) (189)	Larry Brignolia	PTS	10	Nov 14, 1928	43 years, 31 days	Mechanics Building, Boston, Massachusetts, U.S.	
320	Win	91–20–18 (2) (189)	Danny Sears	UD	10	Nov 1, 1928	43 years, 18 days	Arcadia Auditorium, Portsmouth, Ohio, U.S.	
319	Win	90–20–18 (2) (189)	Pete Provencher	PTS	10	Oct 26, 1928	43 years, 12 days	Manchester, New Hampshire, U.S.	
318	Win	89–20–18 (2) (189)	Meyer Cohen	PTS	12	Oct 22, 1928	43 years, 8 days	Valley Arena, Holyoke, Massachusetts, U.S.	
317	Win	88–20–18 (2) (189)	Laddie Lee	NWS	12	Oct 16, 1928	43 years, 2 days	Exposition Building, Portland, Oregon, U.S.	
316	Win	88–20–18 (2) (188)	Jimmy McGonnigle	PTS	10	Oct 12, 1928	42 years, 364 days	Braves Field, Boston, Massachusetts, U.S.	
315	Win	87–20–18 (2) (188)	Pete Pacheco	PTS	10	Oct 1, 1928	42 years, 353 days	Arena, Boston, Massachusetts, U.S.	
314	Win	86–20–18 (2) (188)	Mickey Sears	PTS	10	Sep 24, 1928	42 years, 346 days	Casino Hall, Lynn, Massachusetts, U.S.	
313	Loss	85–20–18 (2) (188)	Pal Silvers	PTS	10	Aug 28, 1928	42 years, 319 days	Queensboro Stadium, Long Island City, New York City, New York, U.S.	
312	Win	85–19–18 (2) (188)	Tony Vaccarelli	PTS	10	Aug 14, 1928	42 years, 305 days	Queensboro Stadium, Long Island City, New York City, New York, U.S.	
311	Win	84–19–18 (2) (188)	Tommy Dunn	PTS	10	Aug 7, 1928	42 years, 319 days	Thompson's Stadium, New York City, New York, U.S.	
310	Win	83–19–18 (2) (188)	Harry Felix	PTS	8	Jul 20, 1928	42 years, 280 days	Long Beach Stadium, Long Beach, New York, U.S.	
309	NC	82–19–18 (2) (188)	Floyd Hybert	NC	5 (10)	Jan 4, 1928	42 years, 82 days	Public Hall, Cleveland, Ohio, U.S.	Referee stopped fight, claiming neither fighter was trying
308	Draw	82–19–18 (1) (188)	Jimmy Jones	NWS	10	Nov 14, 1927	42 years, 31 days	Canton Auditorium, Canton, Ohio, U.S.	
307	Loss	82–19–18 (1) (187)	Hilario Martinez	PTS	10	Oct 17, 1927	42 years, 3 days	Broadway Arena, New York City, New York, U.S.	
306	Win	82–18–18 (1) (187)	Joey Knapp	PTS	10	Sep 19, 1927	41 years, 340 days	St. Nicholas Arena, New York City, New York, U.S.	
305	Win	81–18–18 (1) (187)	Tommy Jordan	PTS	10	Sep 12, 1927	41 years, 333 days	Dexter Park Arena, Woodhaven, New York City, New York, U.S.	
304	Win	80–18–18 (1) (187)	Georgie Levine	PTS	10	Aug 29, 1927	41 years, 319 days	Dexter Park Arena, Woodhaven, New York City, New York, U.S.	
303	Loss	79–18–18 (1) (187)	Bermondsey Billy Wells	PTS	10	Apr 29, 1927	41 years, 197 days	Benjamin Field Arena, Tampa, Florida, U.S.	
302	Win	79–17–18 (1) (187)	Arthur Schaekels	PTS	10	Apr 2, 1927	41 years, 170 days	Race Track Arena, Pompano Beach, Florida, U.S.	
301	Win	78–17–18 (1) (187)	Barney Adair	PTS	10	Sep 6, 1926	40 years, 327 days	West Flagler Stadium, Miami, Florida, U.S.	
300	Win	77–17–18 (1) (187)	Colin McLachin	PTS	10	Aug 2, 1926	40 years, 292 days	West Flagler Stadium, Miami, Florida, U.S.	
299	Win	76–17–18 (1) (187)	Dave Forbes	NWS	10	Jun 26, 1925	39 years, 255 days	Memorial Hall, Kansas City, Kansas, U.S.	
298	Win	76–17–18 (1) (186)	Harry Ritzer	PTS	10	Jun 3, 1925	39 years, 232 days	Wilmington Bowl, Wilmington, Delaware, U.S.	
297	Win	75–17–18 (1) (186)	Roy Moore	PTS	10	May 20, 1925	39 years, 218 days	Wilmington Bowl, Wilmington, Delaware, U.S.	
296	Draw	74–17–18 (1) (186)	Ted Krache	PTS	6	May 16, 1925	39 years, 214 days	Dugdale Park, Seattle, Washington, U.S.	
295	Loss	74–17–17 (1) (186)	Morrie Schlaifer	PTS	10	Mar 20, 1925	39 years, 157 days	Auditorium, Omaha, Nebraska, U.S.	
294	Loss	74–16–17 (1) (186)	Bermondsey Billy Wells	PTS	10	Feb 20, 1925	39 years, 129 days	Dreamland Rink, San Francisco, California, U.S.	
293	Win	74–15–17 (1) (186)	Izzy Tanner	UD	10	Jan 22, 1925	39 years, 100 days	Armory, Portland, Oregon, U.S.	
292	Win	73–15–17 (1) (186)	Norman Genet	PTS	8	Jan 16, 1925	39 years, 94 days	Dreamland Rink, San Francisco, California, U.S.	
291	Win	72–15–17 (1) (186)	Sailor Billy Vincent	PTS	4	Dec 2, 1924	39 years, 49 days	Arena, Vernon, California, U.S.	
290	Loss	71–15–17 (1) (186)	Oakland Jimmy Duffy	PTS	4	Nov 19, 1924	39 years, 36 days	Auditorium, Oakland, California, U.S.	
289	Win	71–14–17 (1) (186)	Phil Krug	NWS	10	Oct 13, 1924	38 years, 365 days	Laurel Garden, Newark, New Jersey, U.S.	
288	Loss	71–14–17 (1) (185)	Phil Kaplan	NWS	10	Oct 1, 1924	38 years, 353 days	Boyle's Thirty Acres, Jersey City, New Jersey, U.S.	
287	Loss	71–14–17 (1) (184)	Jack Rappaport	NWS	10	Aug 28, 1924	38 years, 319 days	Bank Street Open-Air Arena, Newark, New Jersey, U.S.	
286	Draw	71–14–17 (1) (183)	Johnny Karr	NWS	10	Feb 11, 1924	38 years, 120 days	Canton Auditorium, Canton, Ohio, U.S.	
285	Win	71–14–17 (1) (182)	Fred Archer	NWS	10	Jan 21, 1924	38 years, 99 days	Canton Auditorium, Canton, Ohio, U.S.	
284	Win	71–14–17 (1) (181)	Phil Kaplan	PTS	10	Dec 18, 1923	38 years, 65 days	Pioneer Sporting Club, New York City, New York, U.S.	
283	Loss	70–14–17 (1) (181)	Frankie Schoell	PTS	10	Nov 20, 1923	38 years, 37 days	Mechanics Building, Boston, Massachusetts, U.S.	
282	Win	70–13–17 (1) (181)	Jakob 'Soldier' Bartfield	PTS	10	Jun 14, 1923	37 years, 243 days	Kingsboro Stadium, New York City, New York, U.S.	
281	Win	69–13–17 (1) (181)	Cowboy Padgett	NWS	12	Jun 8, 1923	37 years, 237 days	Idora Park, Youngstown, Ohio, U.S.	
280	Win	69–13–17 (1) (180)	Joe O'Hara	PTS	10	May 3, 1923	37 years, 221 days	Dexter Park Pavilion, Chicago, Illinois, U.S.	
279	Win	68–13–17 (1) (180)	Jim Montgomery	PTS	12	Apr 20, 1923	37 years, 188 days	Fort Monroe, Norfolk, New Jersey, U.S.	
278	Draw	67–13–17 (1) (180)	Elino Flores	PTS	4	Mar 28, 1923	37 years, 165 days	Rink S.C., New York City, New York, U.S.	
277	Loss	67–13–16 (1) (180)	Mickey Walker	UD	15	Nov 1, 1922	37 years, 28 days	Madison Square Garden, New York City, New York, U.S.	Lost NYSAC and NBA welterweight titles
276	Win	67–12–16 (1) (180)	Jimmy Kelly	PTS	12	Oct 10, 1922	36 years, 361 days	Nuevo Fronton, Havana, Cuba	
275	Win	66–12–16 (1) (180)	Benny Leonard	DQ	13 (15)	Jun 26, 1922	36 years, 255 days	Velodrome, New York City, New York, U.S.	Retained NYSAC and NBA welterweight titles; Britton came up to one knee after a knockdown and Leonard rushed in and struck him a light blow, causing the referee to disqualify Benny
274	Draw	65–12–16 (1) (180)	Ray Long	PTS	12	May 26, 1922	36 years, 224 days	Coliseum, Oklahoma City, Oklahoma, U.S.	
273	Win	65–12–15 (1) (180)	Morris Lux	TKO	5 (12)	May 16, 1922	36 years, 214 days	McNulty Park, Tulsa, Oklahoma, U.S.	
272	Win	64–12–15 (1) (180)	Cowboy Padgett	PTS	10	May 5, 1922	36 years, 203 days	Auditorium, Omaha, Nebraska, U.S.	
271	Draw	63–12–15 (1) (180)	Dave Shade	MD	15	Feb 17, 1922	36 years, 126 days	Madison Square Garden, New York City, New York, U.S.	Retained NYSAC and NBA welterweight titles
270	Win	63–12–14 (1) (180)	Jim Montgomery	NWS	10	Nov 30, 1921	36 years, 47 days	Lyceum Theater, New Britain, Connecticut, U.S.	
269	Draw	63–12–14 (1) (179)	Mickey Walker	NWS	12	Jul 18, 1921	35 years, 277 days	Armory, Newark, New Jersey, U.S.	
268	Draw	63–12–14 (1) (178)	Frank Barrieau	PTS	10	Jun 8, 1921	35 years, 237 days	Hastings Park Arena, Vancouver, British Columbia, Canada	Retained NYSAC and NBA welterweight titles
267	Draw	63–12–13 (1) (178)	Dave Shade	PTS	10	Jun 3, 1921	35 years, 232 days	Arena, Milwaukie, Oregon, U.S.	Retained NYSAC and NBA welterweight titles
266	Draw	63–12–12 (1) (178)	Travie Davis	PTS	4	May 25, 1921	35 years, 223 days	Pavilion, Seattle, Washington, U.S.	
265	Win	63–12–11 (1) (178)	Johnny Tillman	NWS	10	May 17, 1921	35 years, 215 days	Coliseum, Des Moines, Iowa, U.S.	
264	Win	63–12–11 (1) (177)	Ted 'Kid' Lewis	UD	15	Feb 7, 1921	35 years, 116 days	Madison Square Garden, New York City, New York, U.S.	Retained NYSAC and NBA welterweight titles
263	Win	62–12–11 (1) (177)	Pinky Mitchell	NWS	10	Dec 6, 1920	35 years, 53 days	Auditorium, Milwaukee, Wisconsin, U.S.	
262	Win	62–12–11 (1) (176)	Jake Abel	PTS	10	Nov 29, 1920	35 years, 46 days	Auditorium, Atlanta, Georgia, U.S.	
261	Loss	61–12–11 (1) (176)	Bud Logan	PTS	10	Nov 23, 1920	35 years, 40 days	Beethoven Hall, San Antonio, Texas, U.S.	
260	Win	61–11–11 (1) (176)	Morris Lux	NWS	10	Nov 18, 1920	35 years, 35 days	Convention Hall, Kansas City, Kansas, U.S.	
259	Draw	61–11–11 (1) (175)	Jack Perry	NWS	12	Oct 8, 1920	34 years, 360 days	Coliseum, Toledo, Ohio, U.S.	
258	Win	61–11–11 (1) (174)	Ray Bronson	NWS	10	Sep 6, 1920	34 years, 328 days	Cedar Point Arena, Sandusky, Ohio, U.S.	
257	Win	61–11–11 (1) (173)	Johnny Tillman	NWS	10	Sep 3, 1920	34 years, 325 days	League Park, Cleveland, Ohio, U.S.	NYSAC welterweight title at stake; (via KO only)
256	Draw	61–11–11 (1) (172)	Lou Bogash	PTS	12	Aug 23, 1920	34 years, 314 days	State Street Arena, Bridgeport, Connecticut, U.S.	Retained NYSAC welterweight title
255	Win	61–11–10 (1) (172)	Marcel Thomas	TKO	10 (12)	Jul 26, 1920	34 years, 286 days	1st Regiment Armory, Newark, New Jersey, U.S.	
254	Win	60–11–10 (1) (172)	Eddie Shevlin	NWS	12	Jul 1, 1920	34 years, 261 days	Exposition Building, Portland, Oregon, U.S.	
253	Win	60–11–10 (1) (171)	Len Rowlands	NWS	8	Jun 7, 1920	34 years, 237 days	Ice Palace, Philadelphia, Pennsylvania, U.S.	
252	Win	60–11–10 (1) (170)	Young Joe Borrell	NWS	8	Jun 2, 1920	34 years, 232 days	Ice Palace, Philadelphia, Pennsylvania, U.S.	NYSAC welterweight title at stake; (via KO only)
251	Win	60–11–10 (1) (169)	Johnny Griffiths	NWS	15	May 31, 1920	34 years, 230 days	League Park, Akron, Ohio, U.S.	NYSAC welterweight title at stake; (via KO only)
250	Loss	60–11–10 (1) (168)	Mike O'Dowd	NWS	12	May 17, 1920	34 years, 216 days	Canton Auditorium, Canton, Ohio, U.S.	
249	Win	60–11–10 (1) (167)	Frank Maguire	NWS	6	May 1, 1920	34 years, 200 days	National A.C., Philadelphia, Pennsylvania, U.S.	
248	Win	60–11–10 (1) (166)	Jock Malone	NWS	12	Apr 26, 1920	34 years, 195 days	Canton Auditorium, Canton, Ohio, U.S.	
247	Win	60–11–10 (1) (165)	Dennis O'Keefe	NWS	10	Apr 7, 1920	34 years, 206 days	Coliseum, Kenosha, Wisconsin, U.S.	
246	Win	60–11–10 (1) (164)	Bryan Downey	NWS	10	Mar 26, 1920	34 years, 164 days	Gray's Armory, Cleveland, Ohio, U.S.	
245	Win	60–11–10 (1) (163)	Jack Perry	NWS	12	Mar 17, 1920	34 years, 155 days	Canton Auditorium, Canton, Ohio, U.S.	
244	Win	60–11–10 (1) (162)	Dave Palitz	NWS	10	Mar 8, 1920	34 years, 146 days	Church Street Auditorium, Hartford, Connecticut, U.S.	
243	Win	60–11–10 (1) (161)	Jimmy Conway	PTS	12	Jan 30, 1920	34 years, 108 days	Municipal Auditorium, Savannah, Georgia, U.S.	
242	Win	59–11–10 (1) (161)	Johnny Alberts	NWS	8	Jan 6, 1920	34 years, 84 days	Schuetzen Park, Jersey City, New Jersey, U.S.	
241	Win	59–11–10 (1) (160)	Johnny Gill	NWS	10	Jan 1, 1920	34 years, 79 days	Steelton, Pennsylvania, U.S.	
240	Win	59–11–10 (1) (159)	Steve Latzo	NWS	10	Dec 9, 1919	34 years, 56 days	Johnstown A.C., Johnstown, Pennsylvania, U.S.	
239	Win	59–11–10 (1) (158)	Billy Ryan	KO	11 (12)	Dec 1, 1919	34 years, 48 days	Canton Auditorium, Canton, Ohio, U.S.	
238	Win	58–11–10 (1) (158)	Harvey Thorpe	NWS	10	Nov 25, 1919	34 years, 42 days	Miller's Hall, Buffalo, New York, U.S.	
237	Draw	58–11–10 (1) (157)	Billy Goat Doig	NWS	10	Nov 7, 1919	34 years, 24 days	La Salle, Illinois, U.S.	
236	Win	58–11–10 (1) (156)	Johnny Tillman	NWS	10	Nov 5, 1919	34 years, 22 days	Arcadia Arena, Detroit, Michigan, U.S.	World welterweight title at stake; (via KO only)
235	Win	58–11–10 (1) (155)	Mike O'Dowd	NWS	8	Aug 22, 1919	33 years, 312 days	1st Regiment Armory, Newark, New Jersey, U.S.	
234	Win	58–11–10 (1) (154)	Johnny Griffiths	NWS	12	Aug 7, 1919	33 years, 297 days	Stockyards Stadium, Denver, Colorado, U.S.	
233	Win	58–11–10 (1) (153)	Ted 'Kid' Lewis	NWS	8	Jul 28, 1919	33 years, 287 days	Armory A.A., Jersey City, New Jersey, U.S.	World welterweight title at stake; (via KO only)
232	Win	58–11–10 (1) (152)	Al Knockout Doty	TKO	3 (10)	Jul 9, 1919	33 years, 268 days	Fayette Field, Connellsville, Pennsylvania, U.S.	
231	Win	57–11–10 (1) (152)	Johnny Griffiths	NWS	15	Jul 4, 1919	33 years, 263 days	League Park, Canton, Ohio, U.S.	
230	Loss	57–11–10 (1) (151)	Jack Perry	PTS	12	Jun 26, 1919	33 years, 255 days	South End Baseball Park, Cumberland, Maryland, U.S.	
229	Win	57–10–10 (1) (151)	Walter Mohr	NWS	10	Jun 13, 1919	33 years, 242 days	Theatre francais, Montreal, Quebec, Canada	
228	Win	57–10–10 (1) (150)	Jimmy McCabe	NWS	6	May 24, 1919	33 years, 222 days	National A.C., Philadelphia, Pennsylvania, U.S.	
227	Win	57–10–10 (1) (149)	Joe Welling	NWS	10	May 19, 1919	33 years, 217 days	Arena, Syracuse, New York, U.S.	World welterweight title at stake; (via KO only)
226	Win	57–10–10 (1) (148)	Johnny Tillman	NWS	12	May 12, 1919	33 years, 210 days	Lyric Theater, Baltimore, Maryland, U.S.	
225	Win	57–10–10 (1) (147)	Johnny Griffiths	NWS	12	May 6, 1919	33 years, 204 days	Broadway Auditorium, Buffalo, New York, U.S.	
224	Win	57–10–10 (1) (146)	Jock Malone	NWS	10	Apr 25, 1919	33 years, 193 days	Auditorium, Saint Paul, Minnesota, U.S.	
223	Loss	57–10–10 (1) (145)	Brian Downey	NWS	12	Apr 7, 1919	33 years, 175 days	Canton Auditorium, Canton, Ohio, U.S.	
222	Draw	57–10–10 (1) (144)	Jack Perry	NWS	10	Mar 24, 1919	33 years, 161 days	Duquesne Garden, Pittsburgh, Pennsylvania, U.S	World welterweight title at stake; (via KO only)
221	Win	57–10–10 (1) (143)	Ted 'Kid' Lewis	KO	9 (12), 2:05	Mar 17, 1919	33 years, 154 days	Canton Auditorium, Canton, Ohio, U.S.	Won world welterweight title
220	Win	56–10–10 (1) (143)	Willie Ryan	NWS	8	Feb 10, 1918	32 years, 119 days	Trenton A.C., Trenton, New Jersey, U.S.	
219	Win	56–10–10 (1) (142)	Al Knockout Doty	NWS	12	Feb 3, 1918	32 years, 112 days	Canton Auditorium, Canton, Ohio, U.S.	
218	Win	56–10–10 (1) (141)	Silent Martin	NWS	8	Dec 23, 1918	33 years, 70 days	Grand View Auditorium, Jersey City, New Jersey, U.S.	
217	Loss	56–10–10 (1) (140)	Jakob 'Soldier' Bartfield	NWS	10	Dec 17, 1918	33 years, 64 days	Broadway Auditorium, Buffalo, New York, U.S.	
216	Win	56–10–10 (1) (139)	Jakob 'Soldier' Bartfield	NWS	6	Nov 16, 1918	33 years, 33 days	Madison Square Garden, New York City, New York, U.S.	
215	Draw	56–10–10 (1) (138)	Jakob 'Soldier' Bartfield	NWS	6	Nov 11, 1918	33 years, 28 days	Olympia A.C., Philadelphia, Pennsylvania, U.S.	
214	Win	56–10–10 (1) (137)	Tommy Robson	PTS	12	Sep 17, 1918	32 years, 338 days	Arena, Boston, Massachusetts, U.S.	
213	Win	55–10–10 (1) (137)	Jakob 'Soldier' Bartfield	NWS	6	Aug 6, 1918	32 years, 306 days	Shibe Park, Philadelphia, Pennsylvania, U.S.	
212	Win	55–10–10 (1) (136)	Billy Ryan	TKO	4 (8)	Jul 29, 1918	32 years, 288 days	Armory A.A. Outdoor Arena, Jersey City, New Jersey, U.S.	
211	Win	54–10–10 (1) (136)	Eddie Shevlin	TKO	10 (12)	Jul 16, 1918	32 years, 275 days	Armory, Boston, Massachusetts, U.S.	
210	Win	53–10–10 (1) (136)	Billy Ryan	NWS	8	Jul 15, 1918	32 years, 274 days	Lotus A.C., Perth Amboy, New Jersey, U.S	
209	Win	53–10–10 (1) (135)	K.O. Willie Loughlin	NWS	8	Jul 11, 1918	32 years, 270 days	Atlantic City S.C., Atlantic City, New Jersey, U.S.	
208	Loss	53–10–10 (1) (134)	Benny Leonard	NWS	6	Jun 25, 1918	32 years, 254 days	Shibe Park, Philadelphia, Pennsylvania, U.S.	
207	Win	53–10–10 (1) (133)	Ted 'Kid' Lewis	NWS	6	Jun 20, 1918	32 years, 249 days	Madison Square Garden, New York City, New York, U.S.	
206	Win	53–10–10 (1) (132)	Bryan Downey	PTS	12	Jun 11, 1918	32 years, 240 days	Armory, Boston, Massachusetts, U.S.	
205	Win	52–10–10 (1) (132)	Fighting Zunner	NWS	4	Jun 6, 1918	32 years, 235 days	Broadway Auditorium, Buffalo, New York, U.S.	
204	Win	52–10–10 (1) (131)	Tommy Ferguson	NWS	10	May 16, 1918	32 years, 214 days	Town Hall, Scranton, Pennsylvania, U.S.	
203	Draw	52–10–10 (1) (130)	Ted 'Kid' Lewis	NWS	10	May 2, 1918	32 years, 200 days	Town Hall, Scranton, Pennsylvania, U.S.	World welterweight title at stake; (via KO only)
202	Win	52–10–10 (1) (129)	'Lockport' Jimmy Duffy	DQ	8 (10)	Mar 27, 1918	32 years, 164 days	Armory Auditorium, Atlanta, Georgia, U.S.	Won vacant American welterweight title
201	Win	51–10–10 (1) (129)	Vic Morgan	KO	6 (8)	Mar 20, 1918	32 years, 157 days	Joe Levy's Arena, Chattanooga, Tennessee, U.S.	
200	Win	50–10–10 (1) (129)	Ted 'Kid' Lewis	NWS	10	Mar 6, 1918	32 years, 143 days	Armory Auditorium, Atlanta, Georgia, U.S.	World welterweight title at stake; (via KO only)
199	Win	50–10–10 (1) (128)	Marty Cross	PTS	12	Feb 11, 1918	32 years, 120 days	Marieville Gardens, North Providence, Rhode Island, U.S.	
198	Win	49–10–10 (1) (128)	Tommy Robson	PTS	12	Jan 16, 1918	32 years, 94 days	Marieville Gardens, North Providence, Rhode Island, U.S.	
197	Win	48–10–10 (1) (128)	'Lockport' Jimmy Duffy	NWS	10	Jan 1, 1918	32 years, 79 days	Broadway Auditorium, Buffalo, New York, U.S.	
196	Win	48–10–10 (1) (127)	Johnny Tillman	PTS	12	Dec 4, 1917	32 years, 51 days	Grand Opera House, Boston, Massachusetts, U.S.	
195	Win	47–10–10 (1) (127)	Jakob 'Soldier' Bartfield	NWS	10	Nov 13, 1917	32 years, 30 days	Broadway Auditorium, Buffalo, New York, U.S.	
194	Win	47–10–10 (1) (126)	Johnny Tillman	NWS	6	Nov 12, 1917	32 years, 29 days	Olympia A.C., Philadelphia, Pennsylvania, U.S.	
193	Loss	47–10–10 (1) (125)	Jimmy O'Hagan	NWS	10	Nov 6, 1917	32 years, 23 days	German Hall, Albany, New York, U.S.	
192	Loss	47–10–10 (1) (124)	Benny Leonard	NWS	10	Oct 19, 1917	32 years, 5 days	Harlem S.C., New York City, New York, U.S.	
191	Win	47–10–10 (1) (123)	Eddie Billings	NWS	10	Oct 3, 1917	31 years, 354 days	Grand Opera House, Superior, Wisconsin, U.S.	
190	Win	47–10–10 (1) (122)	Marty Cross	NWS	10	Sep 14, 1917	31 years, 335 days	St. Nicholas Arena, New York City, New York, U.S.	
189	Loss	47–10–10 (1) (121)	Ted 'Kid' Lewis	PTS	20	Jun 25, 1917	31 years, 254 days	Westwood Field, Dayton, Ohio, U.S.	Lost world welterweight title
188	Loss	47–9–10 (1) (121)	Ted 'Kid' Lewis	NWS	10	Jun 14, 1917	31 years, 243 days	St. Nicholas Arena, New York City, New York, U.S.	World welterweight title at stake; (via KO only)
187	Loss	47–9–10 (1) (120)	Ted 'Kid' Lewis	NWS	10	Jun 6, 1917	31 years, 235 days	Coliseum, Saint Louis, Missouri, U.S.	World welterweight title at stake; (via KO only)
186	Loss	47–9–10 (1) (119)	Ted 'Kid' Lewis	NWS	10	May 19, 1917	31 years, 217 days	Massey Hall, Toronto, Ontario, Canada	World welterweight title at stake; (via KO only)
185	Loss	47–9–10 (1) (118)	Mike O'Dowd	NWS	10	May 8, 1917	31 years, 206 days	Broadway S.C., New York City, New York, U.S.	
184	Loss	47–9–10 (1) (117)	Ted 'Kid' Lewis	NWS	10	Mar 26, 1917	31 years, 163 days	Heuck's Opera House, Cincinnati, Ohio, U.S.	World welterweight title at stake; (via KO only)
183	Loss	47–9–10 (1) (116)	Bryan Downey	NWS	12	Mar 5, 1917	31 years, 142 days	Coliseum, Columbus, Ohio, U.S.	
182	Win	47–9–10 (1) (115)	Tommy Robson	NWS	12	Mar 1, 1917	31 years, 138 days	Opera House, Lawrence, Massachusetts, U.S.	
181	Win	47–9–10 (1) (114)	Johnny Griffiths	NWS	10	Jan 29, 1917	31 years, 107 days	Heuck's Opera House, Cincinnati, Ohio, U.S.	
180	Win	47–9–10 (1) (113)	Mike O'Dowd	NWS	10	Jan 25, 1917	31 years, 103 days	Auditorium, Saint Paul, Minnesota, U.S.	
179	Win	47–9–10 (1) (112)	Albert Badoud	NWS	10	Jan 10, 1917	31 years, 88 days	Manhattan Casino, New York City, New York, U.S.	World welterweight title at stake; (via KO only)
178	Win	47–9–10 (1) (111)	'Lockport' Jimmy Duffy	NWS	10	Jan 1, 1917	31 years, 79 days	Broadway Auditorium, Buffalo, New York, U.S.	World welterweight title at stake; (via KO only)
177	Win	47–9–10 (1) (110)	Sam Robideau	NWS	10	Dec 8, 1916	31 years, 55 days	Cleveland A.C., Cleveland, Ohio, U.S.	
176	Win	47–9–10 (1) (109)	Steve Latzo	NWS	10	Dec 4, 1916	31 years, 51 days	Majestic Theatre, Wilkes-Barre, Pennsylvania, U.S.	
175	Win	47–9–10 (1) (108)	Charley White	PTS	12	Nov 21, 1916	31 years, 38 days	Arena, Boston, Massachusetts, U.S.	Retained world welterweight title
174	Draw	46–9–10 (1) (108)	Ted 'Kid' Lewis	PTS	12	Nov 14, 1916	31 years, 31 days	Arena, Boston, Massachusetts, U.S.	Retained world welterweight title
173	Win	46–9–9 (1) (108)	Ted 'Kid' Lewis	PTS	12	Oct 17, 1916	31 years, 3 days	Arena, Boston, Massachusetts, U.S.	Retained world welterweight title
172	Win	45–9–9 (1) (108)	Jimmy Coffey	NWS	10	Oct 2, 1916	30 years, 354 days	Hudson Theatre, Schenectady, New York, U.S.	
171	Win	45–9–9 (1) (107)	Joe Welling	NWS	10	Sep 5, 1916	30 years, 327 days	Broadway Auditorium, Buffalo, New York, U.S.	World welterweight title at stake; (via KO only)
170	Draw	45–9–9 (1) (106)	Johnny Griffiths	PTS	12	Jul 25, 1916	30 years, 285 days	Arena, Boston, Massachusetts, U.S.	
169	Loss	45–9–8 (1) (106)	Battling Kopin	NWS	10	Jun 23, 1916	30 years, 253 days	Arena, Syracuse, New York, U.S.	
168	Win	45–9–8 (1) (105)	Mike O'Dowd	PTS	12	Jun 6, 1916	30 years, 236 days	Arena, Boston, Massachusetts, U.S.	
167	Win	44–9–8 (1) (105)	Ted 'Kid' Lewis	PTS	20	Apr 24, 1916	30 years, 193 days	Louisiana Auditorium, New Orleans, Louisiana, U.S.	Won world welterweight title
166	Win	43–9–8 (1) (105)	Perry 'Kid' Graves	PTS	15	Mar 22, 1916	30 years, 160 days	Gymnastic Club, Dayton, Ohio, U.S.	
165	Win	42–9–8 (1) (105)	Willie K.O. Brennan	NWS	10	Mar 13, 1916	30 years, 151 days	Broadway Auditorium, Buffalo, New York, U.S.	
164	Win	42–9–8 (1) (104)	Ted 'Kid' Lewis	NWS	10	Feb 15, 1916	30 years, 124 days	Broadway Arena, New York City, New York, U.S.	
163	Win	42–9–8 (1) (103)	Silent Martin	NWS	10	Feb 5, 1916	30 years, 114 days	Clermont Avenue Rink, New York City, New York, U.S.	
162	Win	42–9–8 (1) (102)	Hilliard Lang	NWS	6	Jan 21, 1916	30 years, 99 days	Riverdale Rink, Toronto, Ontario, Canada	
161	Win	42–9–8 (1) (101)	Ted 'Kid' Lewis	NWS	10	Jan 20, 1916	30 years, 98 days	Broadway Auditorium, Buffalo, New York, U.S.	World welterweight title at stake; (via KO only)
160	Loss	42–9–8 (1) (100)	Johnny Griffiths	NWS	12	Dec 28, 1915	30 years, 75 days	Winter Garden, Akron, Ohio, U.S.	
159	Win	42–9–8 (1) (99)	Terry Mitchell	NWS	10	Oct 30, 1915	30 years, 16 days	Clermont Avenue Rink, New York City, New York, U.S.	
158	Loss	42–9–8 (1) (98)	Ted 'Kid' Lewis	PTS	12	Sep 28, 1915	29 years, 349 days	Arena (Atlas A.A.), Boston, Massachusetts, U.S.	For world welterweight title
157	Draw	42–8–8 (1) (98)	Johnny Griffiths	NWS	12	Sep 6, 1915	29 years, 327 days	League Park, Canton, Ohio, U.S.	
156	Loss	42–8–8 (1) (97)	Ted 'Kid' Lewis	PTS	12	Aug 31, 1915	29 years, 321 days	Arena, Boston, Massachusetts, U.S.	Lost world welterweight title
155	Win	42–7–8 (1) (97)	Mike Glover	PTS	12	Jun 22, 1915	29 years, 251 days	Arena (Atlas A.A.), Boston, Massachusetts, U.S.	Won world welterweight title
154	Win	41–7–8 (1) (97)	Young Denny	NWS	10	Jun 1, 1915	29 years, 230 days	Heuck's Opera House, Cincinnati, Ohio, U.S.	
153	Win	41–7–8 (1) (96)	Leo Kelly	NWS	10	May 17, 1915	29 years, 215 days	Coliseum, Columbus, Ohio, U.S.	
152	Win	41–7–8 (1) (95)	Ray Campbell	NWS	10	Apr 5, 1915	29 years, 173 days	Garden Theater, Buffalo, New York, U.S.	
151	Win	41–7–8 (1) (94)	Ted 'Kid' Lewis	NWS	10	Mar 26, 1915	29 years, 163 days	135th Street A.C., New York City, New York, U.S.	
150	Win	41–7–8 (1) (93)	Phil Bloom	NWS	10	Mar 13, 1915	29 years, 150 days	Irving A.C., New York City, New York, U.S.	
149	Win	41–7–8 (1) (92)	Jack Toland	NWS	10	Mar 6, 1915	29 years, 143 days	Broadway S.C., New York City, New York, U.S.	
148	Win	41–7–8 (1) (91)	Perry 'Kid' Graves	NWS	10	Jan 30, 1915	29 years, 108 days	Broadway S.C., New York City, New York, U.S.	
147	Win	41–7–8 (1) (90)	Frankie Notter	NWS	10	Jan 9, 1915	29 years, 87 days	Broadway S.C., New York City, New York, U.S.	
146	Win	41–7–8 (1) (89)	Al Dewey	NWS	10	Dec 28, 1914	29 years, 75 days	Majestic Theatre, Wilkes-Barre, Pennsylvania, U.S.	
145	Win	41–7–8 (1) (88)	Joe Hyland	PTS	12	Dec 25, 1914	29 years, 72 days	Hanna Armory, New Britain, Connecticut, U.S.	
144	Loss	40–7–8 (1) (88)	Jakob 'Soldier' Bartfield	NWS	10	Nov 26, 1914	28 years, 135 days	Broadway Arena, New York City, New York, U.S.	
143	Win	40–7–8 (1) (87)	Eddie Moran	PTS	12	Nov 2, 1914	29 years, 19 days	Hanna Armory, New Britain, Connecticut, U.S.	
142	Win	39–7–8 (1) (87)	Eddie Moran	NWS	10	Oct 9, 1914	28 years, 360 days	Ridgewood Grove SC, New York City, New York, U.S.	
141	Win	39–7–8 (1) (86)	Jakob 'Soldier' Bartfield	NWS	10	Sep 26, 1914	28 years, 347 days	Broadway Arena, New York City, New York, U.S.	
140	Win	39–7–8 (1) (85)	Johnny Griffiths	NWS	12	Jul 4, 1914	28 years, 263 days	League Park, Canton, Ohio, U.S.	
139	Win	39–7–8 (1) (84)	Joe Eagan	KO	4 (12)	Jun 30, 1914	28 years, 259 days	Arena (Atlas A.A.), Boston, Massachusetts, U.S.	
138	Win	38–7–8 (1) (84)	Perry 'Kid' Graves	NWS	6	Apr 25, 1914	28 years, 193 days	National A.C., Philadelphia, Pennsylvania, U.S.	
137	Win	38–7–8 (1) (83)	Billy Griffith	NWS	10	Apr 13, 1914	28 years, 181 days	Heuck's Opera House, Cincinnati, Ohio, U.S.	
136	Win	38–7–8 (1) (82)	Leo Kelly	NWS	8	Mar 30, 1914	28 years, 167 days	Coliseum, Saint Louis, Missouri, U.S.	
135	Win	38–7–8 (1) (81)	Perry 'Kid' Graves	NWS	10	Mar 10, 1914	28 years, 147 days	Broadway A.C., New York City, New York, U.S.	
134	Win	38–7–8 (1) (80)	Joe Hirst	NWS	6	Mar 7, 1914	28 years, 144 days	National A.C., Philadelphia, Pennsylvania, U.S.	
133	Win	38–7–8 (1) (79)	Frankie Madden	NWS	10	Feb 24, 1914	28 years, 133 days	Atlantic Garden A.C., New York City, New York, U.S.	
132	Win	38–7–8 (1) (78)	Gene Moriarty	TKO	7 (10)	Feb 17, 1914	28 years, 126 days	Broadway S.C., New York City, New York, U.S.	
131	Win	37–7–8 (1) (78)	Johnny Dohan	NWS	10	Feb 10, 1914	28 years, 119 days	Irving A.C., New York City, New York, U.S.	
130	Win	37–7–8 (1) (77)	Ray Campbell	NWS	10	Jan 31, 1914	28 years, 109 days	Irving A.C., New York City, New York, U.S.	
129	Win	37–7–8 (1) (76)	Mike Glover	NWS	10	Jan 19, 1914	28 years, 97 days	New Amsterdam Opera House, New York City, New York, U.S.	World welterweight title claim at stake; (via KO only)
128	Win	37–7–8 (1) (75)	Phil Bloom	NWS	10	Jan 5, 1914	28 years, 83 days	Madison Square Garden, New York City, New York, U.S.	
127	Draw	37–7–8 (1) (74)	Al Dewey	NWS	10	Dec 29, 1913	28 years, 76 days	Peerless A.C., Wilkes-Barre, Pennsylvania, U.S.	
126	Loss	37–7–8 (1) (73)	Packey McFarland	NWS	10	Dec 8, 1913	28 years, 55 days	Auditorium, Milwaukee, Wisconsin, U.S.	
125	Loss	37–7–8 (1) (72)	Mike Glover	NWS	10	Nov 27, 1913	28 years, 44 days	Irving A.C., New York City, New York, U.S.	World welterweight title claim at stake; (via KO only)
124	Win	37–7–8 (1) (71)	Battling Gates	KO	3 (10)	Nov 21, 1913	28 years, 38 days	Coliseum A.C., Wilkes-Barre, Pennsylvania, U.S.	
123	Win	36–7–8 (1) (71)	Charley White	TKO	18 (20)	Jul 4, 1913	27 years, 263 days	McDonoghville Park, New Orleans, Louisiana, U.S.	
122	Loss	35–7–8 (1) (71)	'Lockport' Jimmy Duffy	NWS	10	Jun 23, 1913	27 years, 252 days	Broadway Auditorium, Buffalo, New York, U.S.	
121	Loss	35–7–8 (1) (70)	'Lockport' Jimmy Duffy	DQ	6 (10)	May 29, 1913	27 years, 227 days	Broadway Auditorium, Buffalo, New York, U.S.	Low Blow
120	Draw	35–6–8 (1) (70)	Eddie Murphy	NWS	10	May 20, 1913	27 years, 218 days	Kenosha, Wisconsin, U.S.	
119	Win	35–6–8 (1) (69)	Perry 'Kid' Graves	NWS	6	May 17, 1913	27 years, 215 days	National A.C., Philadelphia, Pennsylvania, U.S.	
118	Win	35–6–8 (1) (68)	Johnny Dohan	NWS	10	Apr 22, 1913	27 years, 190 days	Irving A.C., New York City, New York, U.S.	
117	NC	35–6–8 (1) (67)	Philadelphia Pal Moore	NC	4 (6)	Apr 21, 1913	27 years, 189 days	Olympia A.C., Philadelphia, Pennsylvania, U.S.	Referee stopped this bout because he felt Britton wasn't trying
116	Win	35–6–8 (67)	Matty Baldwin	NWS	10	Apr 15, 1913	27 years, 183 days	St. Nicholas Arena, New York City, New York, U.S.	
115	Win	35–6–8 (66)	Kid Curley	TKO	3 (6)	Mar 31, 1913	27 years, 168 days	Olympia A.C., Philadelphia, Pennsylvania, U.S.	
114	Win	34–6–8 (66)	Young Abe Brown	NWS	10	Mar 20, 1913	27 years, 157 days	Atlantic Garden A.C., New York City, New York, U.S.	
113	Win	34–6–8 (65)	Johnny Krause	NWS	6	Mar 17, 1913	27 years, 154 days	Olympia A.C., Philadelphia, Pennsylvania, U.S.	
112	Loss	34–6–8 (64)	Packey McFarland	NWS	10	Mar 7, 1913	27 years, 144 days	Madison Square Garden, New York City, New York, U.S.	
111	Win	34–6–8 (63)	Eddie Hanlon	TKO	6 (15)	Jan 31, 1913	27 years, 109 days	Southern A.C., Savannah, Georgia, U.S.	
110	Win	33–6–8 (63)	Jimmy Evans	TKO	7 (8)	Jan 27, 1913	27 years, 105 days	Phoenix A.C., Memphis, Tennessee, U.S.	
109	Win	32–6–8 (63)	Frankie Gage	KO	9 (10)	Jan 18, 1913	27 years, 96 days	Olympia A.C., New Orleans, Louisiana, U.S.	
108	Win	31–6–8 (63)	Joe Thomas	PTS	10	Jan 10, 1913	27 years, 88 days	Olympia A.C., New Orleans, Louisiana, U.S.	
107	Win	30–6–8 (63)	Tommy O'Keefe	KO	2 (6)	Dec 25, 1912	27 years, 72 days	Olympia A.C., Philadelphia, Pennsylvania, U.S.	
106	Draw	29–6–8 (63)	Young Ahearn	NWS	10	Dec 23, 1912	27 years, 70 days	Clermont Avenue Rink, New York City, New York, U.S.	
105	Win	29–6–8 (62)	Frankie Nelson	NWS	10	Dec 17, 1912	27 years, 64 days	Brown's Gym A.A., Far Rockaway, New York City, New York, U.S.	
104	Win	29–6–8 (61)	Frank Loughrey	NWS	6	Dec 6, 1912	27 years, 53 days	Olympia A.C., Philadelphia, Pennsylvania, U.S.	
103	Win	29–6–8 (60)	Billy Bennett	TKO	10 (10)	Dec 5, 1912	27 years, 52 days	Clermont Avenue Rink, New York City, New York, U.S.	
102	Win	28–6–8 (60)	Milburn Saylor	TKO	8 (?)	Nov 28, 1912	27 years, 45 days	Lakeside A.C., Dayton, Ohio, U.S.	
101	Win	27–6–8 (60)	Freddie Duffy	NWS	10	Oct 24, 1912	27 years, 10 days	Forty-Fourth Street A.C., New York City, New York, U.S.	
100	Win	27–6–8 (59)	Leach Cross	NWS	10	Oct 11, 1912	26 years, 363 days	St. Nicholas Arena, New York City, New York, U.S.	
99	Draw	27–6–8 (58)	Young McDonough	PTS	12	Oct 7, 1912	26 years, 359 days	Rhode Island A.C., Thornton, Rhode Island, U.S.	
98	Win	27–6–7 (58)	Joe Eagan	TKO	4 (10)	Oct 2, 1912	26 years, 354 days	St. Nicholas Arena, New York City, New York, U.S.	
97	Win	26–6–7 (58)	Jack Redmond	NWS	10	Sep 24, 1912	26 years, 346 days	New Star A.C., New York City, New York, U.S.	
96	Win	26–6–7 (57)	Milburn Saylor	DQ	6 (12)	Sep 17, 1912	26 years, 339 days	Arena, Boston, Massachusetts, U.S.	
95	Win	25–6–7 (57)	Willie Beecher	NWS	10	Sep 10, 1912	26 years, 332 days	St. Nicholas Arena, New York City, New York, U.S.	
94	Win	25–6–7 (56)	Eddie Murphy	TKO	11 (12)	Aug 27, 1912	26 years, 318 days	Arena, Boston, Massachusetts, U.S.	
93	Win	24–6–7 (56)	Eddie Smith	NWS	10	Aug 12, 1912	26 years, 303 days	Madison Square Garden, New York City, New York, U.S.	
92	Win	24–6–7 (55)	Harry Stone	NWS	10	Jul 17, 1912	26 years, 277 days	St. Nicholas Arena, New York City, New York, U.S.	
91	Win	24–6–7 (54)	Philadelphia Pal Moore	PTS	20	Apr 30, 1912	26 years, 199 days	Dreamland Rink, San Francisco, California, U.S.	
90	Win	23–6–7 (54)	Oakland Frankie Burns	PTS	10	Jan 24, 1912	26 years, 102 days	Piedmont Pavilion, Oakland, California, U.S.	
89	Win	22–6–7 (54)	Al Rogers	PTS	10	Jan 5, 1912	26 years, 83 days	Dreamland Rink, San Francisco, California, U.S.	
88	Draw	21–6–7 (54)	Ray Temple	PTS	4	Dec 8, 1911	26 years, 55 days	Dreamland Rink, San Francisco, California, U.S.	
87	Win	21–6–6 (54)	Johnny McCarthy	PTS	10	Oct 14, 1911	26 years, 0 days	Diepenbrock Theater, Sacramento, California, U.S.	
86	Loss	20–6–6 (54)	Willie Ritchie	PTS	4	Oct 6, 1911	25 years, 357 days	Dreamland Rink, San Francisco, California, U.S.	
85	Win	20–5–6 (54)	Danny O'Brien	KO	1 (4)	Sep 22, 1911	25 years, 343 days	Dreamland Rink, San Francisco, California, U.S.	
84	Loss	19–5–6 (54)	Jerry Murphy	PTS	4	Sep 8, 1911	25 years, 329 days	Dreamland Rink, San Francisco, California, U.S.	
83	Win	19–4–6 (54)	Johnny Marto	NWS	10	May 9, 1911	25 years, 207 days	St. Nicholas Arena, New York City, New York, U.S.	
82	Win	19–4–6 (53)	Jake Barada	PTS	15	Apr 21, 1911	25 years, 189 days	Business Men's A.C., Saint Joseph, Missouri, U.S.	
81	Draw	18–4–6 (53)	Packey McFarland	PTS	8	Jan 30, 1911	25 years, 108 days	Armory AC, Memphis, Tennessee, U.S.	
80	Win	18–4–5 (53)	Ray Temple	PTS	8	Dec 12, 1910	25 years, 59 days	National A.C., Memphis, Tennessee, U.S.	
79	Win	17–4–5 (53)	Farmer 'Kid' Dorbett	PTS	8	Nov 21, 1910	25 years, 38 days	National A.C., Memphis, Tennessee, U.S.	
78	Draw	16–4–5 (53)	Milburn Saylor	PTS	8	Nov 14, 1910	25 years, 31 days	National A.C., Memphis, Tennessee, U.S.	
77	Win	16–4–4 (53)	Bert Keyes	PTS	15	Nov 12, 1910	25 years, 29 days	Southern A.C., Savannah, Georgia, U.S.	
76	Win	15–4–4 (53)	Jack McGuire	KO	7 (10)	Aug 19, 1910	24 years, 309 days	Savannah Theater, Savannah, Georgia, U.S.	
75	Loss	14–4–4 (53)	Ray Bronson	PTS	10	Jun 30, 1910	24 years, 259 days	Royal A.C., New Orleans, Louisiana, U.S.	
74	Draw	14–3–4 (53)	Tommy Devlin	PTS	10	Jun 17, 1910	24 years, 246 days	Savannah Theater, Savannah, Georgia, U.S.	
73	Draw	14–3–3 (53)	Dummy Decker	PTS	15	May 7, 1910	24 years, 205 days	Southern A.C., Savannah, Georgia, U.S.	
72	Draw	14–3–2 (53)	Frankie White	PTS	10	May 5, 1910	24 years, 203 days	Monroe A.C., Atlanta, Georgia, U.S.	
71	Win	14–3–1 (53)	Dummy Decker	PTS	15	Apr 18, 1910	24 years, 186 days	Southern A.C., Savannah, Georgia, U.S.	
70	Win	13–3–1 (53)	Jimmy Dasher	PTS	15	Mar 26, 1910	24 years, 163 days	Southern A.C., Savannah, Georgia, U.S.	
69	Win	12–3–1 (53)	Mike Memsic	PTS	10	Mar 22, 1910	24 years, 159 days	Academy A.C., Atlanta, Georgia, U.S.	
68	Win	11–3–1 (53)	Jack Curley	PTS	15	Mar 18, 1910	24 years, 155 days	Southern A.C., Savannah, Georgia, U.S.	
67	Loss	10–3–1 (53)	Young Erne	NWS	6	Feb 22, 1910	24 years, 131 days	Douglas A.C., Philadelphia, Pennsylvania, U.S.	
66	Win	10–3–1 (52)	Harry Cutch	NWS	6	Jan 25, 1910	24 years, 103 days	Douglas A.C., Philadelphia, Pennsylvania, U.S.	
65	Win	10–3–1 (51)	Patsy Hogan	TKO	14 (15)	Dec 17, 1909	24 years, 64 days	Southern A.C., Savannah, Georgia, U.S.	
64	Win	9–3–1 (51)	Farmer 'Kid' Dorbett	TKO	7 (15)	Dec 9, 1909	24 years, 56 days	Southern A.C., Savannah, Georgia, U.S.	
63	Loss	8–3–1 (51)	Farmer 'Kid' Dorbett	DQ	3 (15)	Dec 3, 1909	24 years, 50 days	Southern A.C., Savannah, Georgia, U.S.	
62	Win	8–2–1 (51)	Harry Stone	NWS	6	Nov 29, 1909	24 years, 46 days	New Philadelphia A.C., Philadelphia, Pennsylvania, U.S.	
61	Loss	8–2–1 (50)	Tommy O'Keefe	NWS	6	Nov 15, 1909	24 years, 32 days	New Philadelphia A.C., Philadelphia, Pennsylvania, U.S.	
60	Win	8–2–1 (49)	Nathan Ehrlich	NWS	6	Oct 25, 1909	24 years, 11 days	New Philadelphia A.C., Philadelphia, Pennsylvania, U.S.	
59	Win	8–2–1 (48)	Joe Sieger	NWS	10	Sep 9, 1909	23 years, 330 days	Long Acre A.C., New York City, New York, U.S.	
58	Win	8–2–1 (47)	Jimmy Dasher	TKO	6 (15)	Jun 18, 1909	23 years, 247 days	Southern A.C., Savannah, Georgia, U.S.	
57	Win	7–2–1 (47)	Jim Holland	KO	4 (15)	Jun 11, 1909	23 years, 240 days	Southern A.C., Savannah, Georgia, U.S.	
56	Draw	6–2–1 (47)	Leo Houck	NWS	6	Mar 18, 1909	23 years, 155 days	Lancaster A.C., Lancaster, Pennsylvania, U.S.	
55	Win	6–2–1 (46)	Joe Hirst	NWS	6	Mar 17, 1909	23 years, 154 days	Washington S.C., Philadelphia, Pennsylvania, U.S.	
54	Win	6–2–1 (45)	Johnny Hogan	NWS	6	Feb 25, 1909	23 years, 134 days	Reading, Pennsylvania, U.S.	
53	Draw	6–2–1 (44)	Leo Houck	NWS	6	Feb 4, 1909	23 years, 113 days	Lancaster A.C., Lancaster, Pennsylvania, U.S.	
52	Win	6–2–1 (43)	Dimp O'Donnell	NWS	6	Feb 3, 1909	23 years, 112 days	Wayne A.C., Philadelphia, Pennsylvania, U.S.	
51	Win	6–2–1 (42)	Charley 'Twin' Miller	NWS	6	Jan 4, 1909	23 years, 82 days	Washington S.C., Philadelphia, Pennsylvania, U.S.	
50	Loss	6–2–1 (41)	Reddy Moore	NWS	6	Dec 14, 1908	23 years, 61 days	West End A.C., Philadelphia, Pennsylvania, U.S.	
49	Draw	6–2–1 (40)	Al Grander	NWS	6	Dec 5, 1908	23 years, 52 days	National A.C., Philadelphia, Pennsylvania, U.S.	
48	Win	6–2–1 (39)	Mike Fleming	NWS	6	Nov 14, 1908	23 years, 31 days	National A.C., Philadelphia, Pennsylvania, U.S.	
47	Draw	6–2–1 (38)	Joe Thiel	NWS	6	Nov 6, 1908	23 years, 23 days	State A.C., Philadelphia, Pennsylvania, U.S.	
46	Win	6–2–1 (37)	Johnny Johnson	NWS	6	Oct 23, 1908	23 years, 9 days	State A.C., Philadelphia, Pennsylvania, U.S.	
45	Loss	6–2–1 (36)	Reddy Moore	NWS	6	Oct 20, 1908	23 years, 6 days	Douglas A.C., Philadelphia, Pennsylvania, U.S.	
44	ND	6–2–1 (35)	Tommy Carey	ND	6	Oct 10, 1908	N/A	Location unknown	Exact date unknown
43	Win	6–2–1 (34)	Percy Cove	NWS	6	Jul 15, 1908	22 years, 275 days	Princess A.C., New York City, New York, U.S.	
42	Draw	6–2–1 (33)	Willie Riley	NWS	6	Jul 11, 1908	22 years, 271 days	Navarre A.C., Ulmer Park, New York City, New York, U.S.	
41	Win	6–2–1 (32)	Johnny Dwyer	NWS	6	Jul 2, 1908	22 years, 262 days	Olympia A.C., New York City, New York, U.S.	
40	Win	6–2–1 (31)	Percy Cove	NWS	6	Jul 1, 1908	22 years, 261 days	Princess A.C., New York City, New York, U.S.	
39	Win	6–2–1 (30)	Johnny Regan	KO	2 (10)	Jun 30, 1908	22 years, 260 days	Navarre A.C., Ulmer Park, New York City, New York, U.S.	
38	Win	5–2–1 (30)	Johnny Dwyer	NWS	6	Jun 23, 1908	22 years, 253 days	Navarre A.C., Ulmer Park, New York City, New York, U.S.	
37	Loss	5–2–1 (29)	Bill Glover	NWS	6	Jun 1, 1908	22 years, 231 days	Dry Dock A.C., New York City, New York, U.S.	
36	ND	5–2–1 (28)	Young Farrell	ND	6	May 5, 1908	N/A	Location unknown	Exact date unknown
35	Loss	5–2–1 (27)	Phil Griffin	NWS	6	Apr 4, 1908	22 years, 173 days	National A.C., Philadelphia, Pennsylvania, U.S.	
34	Win	5–2–1 (26)	Art Edmunds	NWS	6	Feb 27, 1908	22 years, 136 days	Long Acre A.C., New York City, New York, U.S.	
33	Win	5–2–1 (25)	Lew Sheppard	NWS	6	Feb 6, 1908	22 years, 115 days	Long Acre A.C., New York City, New York, U.S.	
32	Win	5–2–1 (24)	Tommy Love	NWS	6	Jan 28, 1908	22 years, 106 days	Reading A.C., Reading, Pennsylvania, U.S.	
31	Win	5–2–1 (23)	Phil Griffin	NWS	6	Jan 6, 1908	22 years, 84 days	Spring Garden A.C., Philadelphia, Pennsylvania, U.S.	
30	Win	5–2–1 (22)	Battling Stinger	NWS	10	Dec 25, 1907	22 years, 72 days	Wilmington, Delaware, U.S.	
29	Loss	5–2–1 (21)	Willie Lucas	NWS	6	Dec 10, 1907	22 years, 57 days	Bijou Theater, Reading, Pennsylvania, U.S.	
28	Win	5–2–1 (20)	Tony Haney	NWS	6	Dec 9, 1907	22 years, 56 days	Spring Garden A.C., Philadelphia, Pennsylvania, U.S.	
27	Loss	5–2–1 (19)	Kid Beebe	NWS	6	Nov 25, 1907	22 years, 42 days	Landmessers Hall, Wilkes-Barre, Pennsylvania, U.S.	
26	Draw	5–2–1 (18)	Tony Haney	NWS	6	Nov 19, 1907	22 years, 36 days	Bijou Theater, Reading, Pennsylvania, U.S.	
25	Draw	5–2–1 (17)	Bobby O'Neill	NWS	6	Nov 11, 1907	22 years, 28 days	Spring Garden A.C., Philadelphia, Pennsylvania, U.S.	
24	Win	5–2–1 (16)	Kid Haney	NWS	6	Nov 9, 1907	22 years, 26 days	National A.C., Philadelphia, Pennsylvania, U.S.	
23	Win	5–2–1 (15)	Young Bechtel	KO	2 (6)	Nov 5, 1907	22 years, 22 days	Bijou Theater, Reading, Pennsylvania, U.S.	
22	Win	4–2–1 (15)	Eddie Carton	NWS	6	Nov 4, 1907	22 years, 21 days	Spring Garden A.C., Philadelphia, Pennsylvania, U.S.	
21	Win	4–2–1 (14)	Young Kid Broad	NWS	6	Oct 21, 1907	22 years, 7 days	Spring Garden A.C., Philadelphia, Pennsylvania, U.S.	
20	Win	4–2–1 (13)	Eddie O'Neil	NWS	6	Sep 20, 1907	21 years, 341 days	Paddock A.C., New York City, New York, U.S.	
19	Win	4–2–1 (12)	Mississippi	NWS	6	Sep 10, 1907	21 years, 331 days	Consolidated A.C., New York City, New York, U.S.	
18	Win	4–2–1 (11)	Terry Young	NWS	6	Sep 9, 1907	21 years, 330 days	Crown A.C., Clermont Rink, New York City, New York, U.S.	
17	Draw	4–2–1 (10)	Farmer 'Kid' Dorbett	PTS	6	Jun 19, 1907	21 years, 248 days	Gayety Theater, Baltimore, Maryland, U.S.	
16	Draw	4–2 (10)	Young Pierce	NWS	6	Jun 5, 1907	21 years, 234 days	Wayne A.C., Philadelphia, Pennsylvania, U.S.	
15	Win	4–2 (9)	Kid Gilbert	TKO	3 (6)	May 24, 1907	21 years, 222 days	National S.C., Wilmington, Delaware, U.S.	
14	Win	3–2 (9)	Joe Smith	NWS	6	May 17, 1907	21 years, 215 days	New Penn Art A.C., Philadelphia, Pennsylvania, U.S.	
13	Draw	3–2 (8)	Kid Hogan	NWS	6	Mar 9, 1907	21 years, 146 days	National A.C., Philadelphia, Pennsylvania, U.S.	
12	Win	3–2 (7)	Young Karl	NWS	6	Jan 25, 1907	21 years, 103 days	Wayne A.C., Philadelphia, Pennsylvania, U.S.	
11	Draw	3–2 (6)	Eddie Fay	NWS	6	Jan 12, 1907	21 years, 90 days	National A.C., Philadelphia, Pennsylvania, U.S.	
10	ND	3–2 (5)	Tommy Herman	ND	6	Dec 1, 1906	21 years, 48 days	Location unknown	
9	Loss	3–2 (4)	Leo Houck	NWS	6	Oct 18, 1906	21 years, 4 days	Lancaster A.C., Lancaster, Pennsylvania, U.S.	
8	Draw	3–2 (3)	Young Loughrey	NWS	6	Apr 18, 1906	20 years, 186 days	National S.C., Wilmington, Delaware, U.S.	
7	Win	3–2 (2)	Jimmy Earle	PTS	6	Mar 28, 1906	20 years, 165 days	National S.C., Wilmington, Delaware, U.S.	
6	Win	2–2 (2)	Todo Moran	NWS	6	Feb 17, 1906	20 years, 126 days	National A.C., Philadelphia, Pennsylvania, U.S.	
5	Win	2–2 (1)	Eddie Wallace	PTS	6	Feb 14, 1906	20 years, 123 days	National S.C., Wilmington, Delaware, U.S.	
4	Win	1–2 (1)	Young Loughrey	NWS	6	Jan 1, 1906	20 years, 79 days	National S.C., Wilmington, Delaware, U.S.	
3	Loss	1–2	Steve Kinney	KO	1 (6)	Oct 20, 1905	20 years, 6 days	Panorama Building, Milwaukee, Wisconsin, U.S.	
2	Loss	1–1	Tommy Shea	PTS	6	Oct 7, 1905	19 years, 358 days	Chicago A.A., Chicago, Illinois, U.S.	
1	Win	1–0	Jack Nolan	PTS	6	Nov 11, 1904	19 years, 28 days	Badger A.C., Milwaukee, Wisconsin, U.S.	

=== Unofficial record ===
345 fights	237 wins	60 losses
By knockout	30	1
By decision	205	57
By disqualification	2	2
Draws	43	
No contests	5	

Record with the inclusion of newspaper decisions in the win/loss/draw column.

No.	Result	Record	Opponent	Type	Round, time	Date	Age	Location	Notes
345	Loss	237–60–43 (5)	Rudy Marshall	PTS	10	Jul 29, 1930	44 years, 288 days	Beckley Avenue Arena, Stamford, Connecticut, U.S.	
344	Win	237–59–43 (5)	Bobby Ruffalo	PTS	8	May 8, 1930	44 years, 206 days	Columbus Hall, Yonkers, New York, U.S.	
343	Win	236–59–43 (5)	Alf Schell	PTS	10	Mar 6, 1930	44 years, 143 days	Foot Guard Hall, Hartford, Connecticut, U.S.	
342	Win	235–59–43 (5)	Ralph Hood	PTS	10	Jan 20, 1930	44 years, 98 days	Roanoke Auditorium, Roanoke, Virginia, U.S.	
341	Loss	234–59–43 (5)	Farmer Joe Cooper	PTS	10	Dec 17, 1929	44 years, 64 days	Armory, Charlotte, North Carolina, U.S.	
340	Loss	234–58–43 (5)	Sam Bruce	PTS	6	Dec 6, 1929	44 years, 53 days	Broadway Auditorium, Buffalo, New York, U.S.	
339	Loss	234–57–43 (5)	Elmer Bezenah	NWS	6	Oct 19, 1929	44 years, 5 days	Ohio National Guard Armory, Cincinnati, Ohio, U.S.	
338	Draw	234–56–43 (5)	Frankie Palmo	PTS	10	Oct 14, 1929	44 years, 0 days	Baesman Hall, Portsmouth, Ohio, U.S.	
337	Loss	234–56–42 (5)	Johnny Roberts	SD	10	Sep 30, 1929	43 years, 351 days	Baesman Hall, Portsmouth, Ohio, U.S.	
336	Draw	234–55–42 (5)	George Gibbons	PTS	6	Sep 2, 1929	43 years, 323 days	Kenton, Ohio, U.S.	
335	Loss	234–55–41 (5)	Henry Firpo	UD	10	Aug 21, 1929	43 years, 311 days	Weller Theater, Zanesville, Ohio, U.S.	
334	Loss	234–54–41 (5)	Morrie Sherman	PTS	10	Aug 19, 1929	43 years, 309 days	Ramona Baseball Park, Grand Rapids, Michigan, U.S.	
333	Loss	234–53–41 (5)	Ham Jenkins	PTS	10	Jul 9, 1929	43 years, 268 days	Olympic A.C., Denver, Colorado, U.S.	
332	Win	234–52–41 (5)	Patsy Pollock	PTS	10	Jun 24, 1929	43 years, 253 days	Logan Square Baseball Park, Chicago, Illinois, U.S.	
331	Win	233–52–41 (5)	Billy Brown	PTS	12	Jun 10, 1929	43 years, 239 days	Coliseum Arena, New Orleans, Louisiana, U.S.	
330	Loss	232–52–41 (5)	James Red Herring	PTS	8	Apr 22, 1929	43 years, 190 days	Stadium, Memphis, Tennessee, U.S.	
329	Win	232–51–41 (5)	Tot Wilson	PTS	10	Apr 12, 1929	43 years, 180 days	Macon, Georgia, U.S.	
328	Win	231–51–41 (5)	Grover Mallini	PTS	10	Apr 8, 1929	43 years, 176 days	Mobile, Alabama, U.S.	
327	Win	230–51–41 (5)	Ted Goodrich	PTS	10	Apr 4, 1929	43 years, 172 days	Auditorium, Atlanta, Georgia, U.S.	
326	Win	229–51–41 (5)	Farmer Joe Cooper	PTS	10	Mar 22, 1929	43 years, 159 days	Coliseum Arena, New Orleans, Louisiana, U.S.	
325	Win	228–51–41 (5)	Spike Webb	PTS	10	Feb 26, 1929	43 years, 135 days	Biscayne Arena, Miami, Florida, U.S.	
324	Win	227–51–41 (5)	Cliff Wellons	PTS	10	Feb 20, 1929	43 years, 129 days	Biscayne Arena, Miami, Florida, U.S.	
323	Win	226–51–41 (5)	Canada Lee	PTS	10	Dec 20, 1928	43 years, 67 days	Boston Garden, Boston, Massachusetts, U.S.	
322	Loss	225–51–41 (5)	Frankie O'Brien	PTS	10	Dec 7, 1928	43 years, 54 days	Boston Garden, Boston, Massachusetts, U.S.	
321	Win	225–50–41 (5)	Larry Brignolia	PTS	10	Nov 14, 1928	43 years, 31 days	Mechanics Building, Boston, Massachusetts, U.S.	
320	Win	224–50–41 (5)	Danny Sears	UD	10	Nov 1, 1928	43 years, 18 days	Arcadia Auditorium, Portsmouth, Ohio, U.S.	
319	Win	223–50–41 (5)	Pete Provencher	PTS	10	Oct 26, 1928	43 years, 12 days	Manchester, New Hampshire, U.S.	
318	Win	222–50–41 (5)	Meyer Cohen	PTS	12	Oct 22, 1928	43 years, 8 days	Valley Arena, Holyoke, Massachusetts, U.S.	
317	Win	221–50–41 (5)	Laddie Lee	NWS	12	Oct 16, 1928	43 years, 2 days	Exposition Building, Portland, Oregon, U.S.	
316	Win	220–50–41 (5)	Jimmy McGonnigle	PTS	10	Oct 12, 1928	42 years, 364 days	Braves Field, Boston, Massachusetts, U.S.	
315	Win	219–50–41 (5)	Pete Pacheco	PTS	10	Oct 1, 1928	42 years, 353 days	Arena, Boston, Massachusetts, U.S.	
314	Win	218–50–41 (5)	Mickey Sears	PTS	10	Sep 24, 1928	42 years, 346 days	Casino Hall, Lynn, Massachusetts, U.S.	
313	Loss	217–50–41 (5)	Pal Silvers	PTS	10	Aug 28, 1928	42 years, 319 days	Queensboro Stadium, Long Island City, New York City, New York, U.S.	
312	Win	217–49–41 (5)	Tony Vaccarelli	PTS	10	Aug 14, 1928	42 years, 305 days	Queensboro Stadium, Long Island City, New York City, New York, U.S.	
311	Win	216–49–41 (5)	Tommy Dunn	PTS	10	Aug 7, 1928	42 years, 319 days	Thompson's Stadium, New York City, New York, U.S.	
310	Win	215–49–41 (5)	Harry Felix	PTS	8	Jul 20, 1928	42 years, 280 days	Long Beach Stadium, Long Beach, New York, U.S.	
309	NC	214–49–41 (5)	Floyd Hybert	NC	5 (10)	Jan 4, 1928	42 years, 82 days	Public Hall, Cleveland, Ohio, U.S.	Referee stopped fight, claiming neither fighter was trying
308	Draw	214–49–41 (4)	Jimmy Jones	NWS	10	Nov 14, 1927	42 years, 31 days	Canton Auditorium, Canton, Ohio, U.S.	
307	Loss	214–49–40 (4)	Hilario Martinez	PTS	10	Oct 17, 1927	42 years, 3 days	Broadway Arena, New York City, New York, U.S.	
306	Win	214–48–40 (4)	Joey Knapp	PTS	10	Sep 19, 1927	41 years, 340 days	St. Nicholas Arena, New York City, New York, U.S.	
305	Win	213–48–40 (4)	Tommy Jordan	PTS	10	Sep 12, 1927	41 years, 333 days	Dexter Park Arena, Woodhaven, New York City, New York, U.S.	
304	Win	212–48–40 (4)	Georgie Levine	PTS	10	Aug 29, 1927	41 years, 319 days	Dexter Park Arena, Woodhaven, New York City, New York, U.S.	
303	Loss	211–48–40 (4)	Bermondsey Billy Wells	PTS	10	Apr 29, 1927	41 years, 197 days	Benjamin Field Arena, Tampa, Florida, U.S.	
302	Win	211–47–40 (4)	Arthur Schaekels	PTS	10	Apr 2, 1927	41 years, 170 days	Race Track Arena, Pompano Beach, Florida, U.S.	
301	Win	210–47–40 (4)	Barney Adair	PTS	10	Sep 6, 1926	40 years, 327 days	West Flagler Stadium, Miami, Florida, U.S.	
300	Win	209–47–40 (4)	Colin McLachin	PTS	10	Aug 2, 1926	40 years, 292 days	West Flagler Stadium, Miami, Florida, U.S.	
299	Win	208–47–40 (4)	Dave Forbes	NWS	10	Jun 26, 1925	39 years, 255 days	Memorial Hall, Kansas City, Kansas, U.S.	
298	Win	207–47–40 (4)	Harry Ritzer	PTS	10	Jun 3, 1925	39 years, 232 days	Wilmington Bowl, Wilmington, Delaware, U.S.	
297	Win	206–47–40 (4)	Roy Moore	PTS	10	May 20, 1925	39 years, 218 days	Wilmington Bowl, Wilmington, Delaware, U.S.	
296	Draw	205–47–40 (4)	Ted Krache	PTS	6	May 16, 1925	39 years, 214 days	Dugdale Park, Seattle, Washington, U.S.	
295	Loss	205–47–39 (4)	Morrie Schlaifer	PTS	10	Mar 20, 1925	39 years, 157 days	Auditorium, Omaha, Nebraska, U.S.	
294	Loss	205–46–39 (4)	Bermondsey Billy Wells	PTS	10	Feb 20, 1925	39 years, 129 days	Dreamland Rink, San Francisco, California, U.S.	
293	Win	205–45–39 (4)	Izzy Tanner	UD	10	Jan 22, 1925	39 years, 100 days	Armory, Portland, Oregon, U.S.	
292	Win	204–45–39 (4)	Norman Genet	PTS	8	Jan 16, 1925	39 years, 94 days	Dreamland Rink, San Francisco, California, U.S.	
291	Win	203–45–39 (4)	Sailor Billy Vincent	PTS	4	Dec 2, 1924	39 years, 49 days	Arena, Vernon, California, U.S.	
290	Loss	202–45–39 (4)	Oakland Jimmy Duffy	PTS	4	Nov 19, 1924	39 years, 36 days	Auditorium, Oakland, California, U.S.	
289	Win	202–44–39 (4)	Phil Krug	NWS	10	Oct 13, 1924	38 years, 365 days	Laurel Garden, Newark, New Jersey, U.S.	
288	Loss	201–44–39 (4)	Phil Kaplan	NWS	10	Oct 1, 1924	38 years, 353 days	Boyle's Thirty Acres, Jersey City, New Jersey, U.S.	
287	Loss	201–43–39 (4)	Jack Rappaport	NWS	10	Aug 28, 1924	38 years, 319 days	Bank Street Open-Air Arena, Newark, New Jersey, U.S.	
286	Draw	201–42–39 (4)	Johnny Karr	NWS	10	Feb 11, 1924	38 years, 120 days	Canton Auditorium, Canton, Ohio, U.S.	
285	Win	201–42–38 (4)	Fred Archer	NWS	10	Jan 21, 1924	38 years, 99 days	Canton Auditorium, Canton, Ohio, U.S.	
284	Win	200–42–38 (4)	Phil Kaplan	PTS	10	Dec 18, 1923	38 years, 65 days	Pioneer Sporting Club, New York City, New York, U.S.	
283	Loss	199–42–38 (4)	Frankie Schoell	PTS	10	Nov 20, 1923	38 years, 37 days	Mechanics Building, Boston, Massachusetts, U.S.	
282	Win	199–41–38 (4)	Jakob "Soldier" Bartfield	PTS	10	Jun 14, 1923	37 years, 243 days	Kingsboro Stadium, New York City, New York, U.S.	
281	Win	198–41–38 (4)	Cowboy Padgett	NWS	12	Jun 8, 1923	37 years, 237 days	Idora Park, Youngstown, Ohio, U.S.	
280	Win	197–41–38 (4)	Joe O'Hara	PTS	10	May 3, 1923	37 years, 221 days	Dexter Park Pavilion, Chicago, Illinois, U.S.	
279	Win	196–41–38 (4)	Jim Montgomery	PTS	12	Apr 20, 1923	37 years, 188 days	Fort Monroe, Norfolk, New Jersey, U.S.	
278	Draw	195–41–38 (4)	Elino Flores	PTS	4	Mar 28, 1923	37 years, 165 days	Rink S.C., New York City, New York, U.S.	
277	Loss	195–41–37 (4)	Mickey Walker	UD	15	Nov 1, 1922	37 years, 28 days	Madison Square Garden, New York City, New York, U.S.	Lost NYSAC and NBA welterweight titles
276	Win	195–40–37 (4)	Jimmy Kelly	PTS	12	Oct 10, 1922	36 years, 361 days	Nuevo Fronton, Havana, Cuba	
275	Win	194–40–37 (4)	Benny Leonard	DQ	13 (15)	Jun 26, 1922	36 years, 255 days	Velodrome, New York City, New York, U.S.	Retained NYSAC and NBA welterweight titles; Britton came up to one knee after a knockdown and Leonard rushed in and struck him a light blow, causing the referee to disqualify Benny
274	Draw	193–40–37 (4)	Ray Long	PTS	12	May 26, 1922	36 years, 224 days	Coliseum, Oklahoma City, Oklahoma, U.S.	
273	Win	193–40–36 (4)	Morris Lux	TKO	5 (12)	May 16, 1922	36 years, 214 days	McNulty Park, Tulsa, Oklahoma, U.S.	
272	Win	192–40–36 (4)	Cowboy Padgett	PTS	10	May 5, 1922	36 years, 203 days	Auditorium, Omaha, Nebraska, U.S.	
271	Draw	191–40–36 (4)	Dave Shade	MD	15	Feb 17, 1922	36 years, 126 days	Madison Square Garden, New York City, New York, U.S.	Retained NYSAC and NBA welterweight titles
270	Win	191–40–35 (4)	Jim Montgomery	NWS	10	Nov 30, 1921	36 years, 47 days	Lyceum Theater, New Britain, Connecticut, U.S.	
269	Draw	190–40–35 (4)	Mickey Walker	NWS	12	Jul 18, 1921	35 years, 277 days	Armory, Newark, New Jersey, U.S.	
268	Draw	190–40–34 (4)	Frank Barrieau	PTS	10	Jun 8, 1921	35 years, 237 days	Hastings Park Arena, Vancouver, British Columbia, Canada	Retained NYSAC and NBA welterweight titles
267	Draw	190–40–33 (4)	Dave Shade	PTS	10	Jun 3, 1921	35 years, 232 days	Arena, Milwaukie, Oregon, U.S.	Retained NYSAC and NBA welterweight titles
266	Draw	190–40–32 (4)	Travie Davis	PTS	4	May 25, 1921	35 years, 223 days	Pavilion, Seattle, Washington, U.S.	
265	Win	190–40–31 (4)	Johnny Tillman	NWS	10	May 17, 1921	35 years, 215 days	Coliseum, Des Moines, Iowa, U.S.	
264	Win	189–40–31 (4)	Ted 'Kid' Lewis	UD	15	Feb 7, 1921	35 years, 116 days	Madison Square Garden, New York City, New York, U.S.	Retained NYSAC and NBA welterweight titles
263	Win	188–40–31 (4)	Pinky Mitchell	NWS	10	Dec 6, 1920	35 years, 53 days	Auditorium, Milwaukee, Wisconsin, U.S.	
262	Win	187–40–31 (4)	Jake Abel	PTS	10	Nov 29, 1920	35 years, 46 days	Auditorium, Atlanta, Georgia, U.S.	
261	Loss	186–40–31 (4)	Bud Logan	PTS	10	Nov 23, 1920	35 years, 40 days	Beethoven Hall, San Antonio, Texas, U.S.	
260	Win	186–39–31 (4)	Morris Lux	NWS	10	Nov 18, 1920	35 years, 35 days	Convention Hall, Kansas City, Kansas, U.S.	
259	Draw	185–39–31 (4)	Jack Perry	NWS	12	Oct 8, 1920	34 years, 360 days	Coliseum, Toledo, Ohio, U.S.	
258	Win	185–39–30 (4)	Ray Bronson	NWS	10	Sep 6, 1920	34 years, 328 days	Cedar Point Arena, Sandusky, Ohio, U.S.	
257	Win	184–39–30 (4)	Johnny Tillman	NWS	10	Sep 3, 1920	34 years, 325 days	League Park, Cleveland, Ohio, U.S.	NYSAC welterweight title at stake; (via KO only)
256	Draw	183–39–30 (4)	Lou Bogash	PTS	12	Aug 23, 1920	34 years, 314 days	State Street Arena, Bridgeport, Connecticut, U.S.	Retained NYSAC welterweight title
255	Win	183–39–29 (4)	Marcel Thomas	TKO	10 (12)	Jul 26, 1920	34 years, 286 days	1st Regiment Armory, Newark, New Jersey, U.S.	
254	Win	182–39–29 (4)	Eddie Shevlin	NWS	12	Jul 1, 1920	34 years, 261 days	Exposition Building, Portland, Oregon, U.S.	
253	Win	181–39–29 (4)	Len Rowlands	NWS	8	Jun 7, 1920	34 years, 237 days	Ice Palace, Philadelphia, Pennsylvania, U.S.	
252	Win	180–39–29 (4)	Young Joe Borrell	NWS	8	Jun 2, 1920	34 years, 232 days	Ice Palace, Philadelphia, Pennsylvania, U.S.	NYSAC welterweight title at stake; (via KO only)
251	Win	179–39–29 (4)	Johnny Griffiths	NWS	15	May 31, 1920	34 years, 230 days	League Park, Akron, Ohio, U.S.	NYSAC welterweight title at stake; (via KO only)
250	Loss	178–39–29 (4)	Mike O'Dowd	NWS	12	May 17, 1920	34 years, 216 days	Canton Auditorium, Canton, Ohio, U.S.	
249	Win	178–38–29 (4)	Frank Maguire	NWS	6	May 1, 1920	34 years, 200 days	National A.C., Philadelphia, Pennsylvania, U.S.	
248	Win	177–38–29 (4)	Jock Malone	NWS	12	Apr 26, 1920	34 years, 195 days	Canton Auditorium, Canton, Ohio, U.S.	
247	Win	176–38–29 (4)	Dennis O'Keefe	NWS	10	Apr 7, 1920	34 years, 206 days	Coliseum, Kenosha, Wisconsin, U.S.	
246	Win	175–38–29 (4)	Bryan Downey	NWS	10	Mar 26, 1920	34 years, 164 days	Gray's Armory, Cleveland, Ohio, U.S.	
245	Win	174–38–29 (4)	Jack Perry	NWS	12	Mar 17, 1920	34 years, 155 days	Canton Auditorium, Canton, Ohio, U.S.	
244	Win	173–38–29 (4)	Dave Palitz	NWS	10	Mar 8, 1920	34 years, 146 days	Church Street Auditorium, Hartford, Connecticut, U.S.	
243	Win	172–38–29 (4)	Jimmy Conway	PTS	12	Jan 30, 1920	34 years, 108 days	Municipal Auditorium, Savannah, Georgia, U.S.	
242	Win	171–38–29 (4)	Johnny Alberts	NWS	8	Jan 6, 1920	34 years, 84 days	Schuetzen Park, Jersey City, New Jersey, U.S.	
241	Win	170–38–29 (4)	Johnny Gill	NWS	10	Jan 1, 1920	34 years, 79 days	Steelton, Pennsylvania, U.S.	
240	Win	169–38–29 (4)	Steve Latzo	NWS	10	Dec 9, 1919	34 years, 56 days	Johnstown A.C., Johnstown, Pennsylvania, U.S.	
239	Win	168–38–29 (4)	Billy Ryan	KO	11 (12)	Dec 1, 1919	34 years, 48 days	Canton Auditorium, Canton, Ohio, U.S.	
238	Win	167–38–29 (4)	Harvey Thorpe	NWS	10	Nov 25, 1919	34 years, 42 days	Miller's Hall, Buffalo, New York, U.S.	
237	Draw	166–38–29 (4)	Billy Goat Doig	NWS	10	Nov 7, 1919	34 years, 24 days	La Salle, Illinois, U.S.	
236	Win	166–38–28 (4)	Johnny Tillman	NWS	10	Nov 5, 1919	34 years, 22 days	Arcadia Arena, Detroit, Michigan, U.S.	World welterweight title at stake; (via KO only)
235	Win	165–38–28 (4)	Mike O'Dowd	NWS	8	Aug 22, 1919	33 years, 312 days	1st Regiment Armory, Newark, New Jersey, U.S.	
234	Win	164–38–28 (4)	Johnny Griffiths	NWS	12	Aug 7, 1919	33 years, 297 days	Stockyards Stadium, Denver, Colorado, U.S.	
233	Win	163–38–28 (4)	Ted 'Kid' Lewis	NWS	8	Jul 28, 1919	33 years, 287 days	Armory A.A., Jersey City, New Jersey, U.S.	World welterweight title at stake; (via KO only)
232	Win	162–38–28 (4)	Al Knockout Doty	TKO	3 (10)	Jul 9, 1919	33 years, 268 days	Fayette Field, Connellsville, Pennsylvania, U.S.	
231	Win	161–38–28 (4)	Johnny Griffiths	NWS	15	Jul 4, 1919	33 years, 263 days	League Park, Canton, Ohio, U.S.	
230	Loss	160–38–28 (4)	Jack Perry	PTS	12	Jun 26, 1919	33 years, 255 days	South End Baseball Park, Cumberland, Maryland, U.S.	
229	Win	160–37–28 (4)	Walter Mohr	NWS	10	Jun 13, 1919	33 years, 242 days	Theatre francais, Montreal, Quebec, Canada	
228	Win	159–37–28 (4)	Jimmy McCabe	NWS	6	May 24, 1919	33 years, 222 days	National A.C., Philadelphia, Pennsylvania, U.S.	
227	Win	158–37–28 (4)	Joe Welling	NWS	10	May 19, 1919	33 years, 217 days	Arena, Syracuse, New York, U.S.	World welterweight title at stake; (via KO only)
226	Win	157–37–28 (4)	Johnny Tillman	NWS	12	May 12, 1919	33 years, 210 days	Lyric Theater, Baltimore, Maryland, U.S.	
225	Win	156–37–28 (4)	Johnny Griffiths	NWS	12	May 6, 1919	33 years, 204 days	Broadway Auditorium, Buffalo, New York, U.S.	
224	Win	155–37–28 (4)	Jock Malone	NWS	10	Apr 25, 1919	33 years, 193 days	Auditorium, Saint Paul, Minnesota, U.S.	
223	Loss	154–37–28 (4)	Brian Downey	NWS	12	Apr 7, 1919	33 years, 175 days	Canton Auditorium, Canton, Ohio, U.S.	
222	Draw	154–36–28 (4)	Jack Perry	NWS	10	Mar 24, 1919	33 years, 161 days	Duquesne Garden, Pittsburgh, Pennsylvania, U.S	World welterweight title at stake; (via KO only)
221	Win	154–36–27 (4)	Ted 'Kid' Lewis	KO	9 (12), 2:05	Mar 17, 1919	33 years, 154 days	Canton Auditorium, Canton, Ohio, U.S.	Won world welterweight title
220	Win	153–36–27 (4)	Willie Ryan	NWS	8	Feb 10, 1918	32 years, 119 days	Trenton A.C., Trenton, New Jersey, U.S.	
219	Win	152–36–27 (4)	Al Knockout Doty	NWS	12	Feb 3, 1918	32 years, 112 days	Canton Auditorium, Canton, Ohio, U.S.	
218	Win	151–36–27 (4)	Silent Martin	NWS	8	Dec 23, 1918	33 years, 70 days	Grand View Auditorium, Jersey City, New Jersey, U.S.	
217	Loss	150–36–27 (4)	Jakob "Soldier" Bartfield	NWS	10	Dec 17, 1918	33 years, 64 days	Broadway Auditorium, Buffalo, New York, U.S.	
216	Win	150–35–27 (4)	Jakob "Soldier" Bartfield	NWS	6	Nov 16, 1918	33 years, 33 days	Madison Square Garden, New York City, New York, U.S.	
215	Draw	149–35–27 (4)	Jakob "Soldier" Bartfield	NWS	6	Nov 11, 1918	33 years, 28 days	Olympia A.C., Philadelphia, Pennsylvania, U.S.	
214	Win	149–35–26 (4)	Tommy Robson	PTS	12	Sep 17, 1918	32 years, 338 days	Arena, Boston, Massachusetts, U.S.	
213	Win	148–35–26 (4)	Jakob "Soldier" Bartfield	NWS	6	Aug 6, 1918	32 years, 306 days	Shibe Park, Philadelphia, Pennsylvania, U.S.	
212	Win	147–35–26 (4)	Billy Ryan	TKO	4 (8)	Jul 29, 1918	32 years, 288 days	Armory A.A. Outdoor Arena, Jersey City, New Jersey, U.S.	
211	Win	146–35–26 (4)	Eddie Shevlin	TKO	10 (12)	Jul 16, 1918	32 years, 275 days	Armory, Boston, Massachusetts, U.S.	
210	Win	145–35–26 (4)	Billy Ryan	NWS	8	Jul 15, 1918	32 years, 274 days	Lotus A.C., Perth Amboy, New Jersey, U.S	
209	Win	144–35–26 (4)	K.O. Willie Loughlin	NWS	8	Jul 11, 1918	32 years, 270 days	Atlantic City S.C., Atlantic City, New Jersey, U.S.	
208	Loss	143–35–26 (4)	Benny Leonard	NWS	6	Jun 25, 1918	32 years, 254 days	Shibe Park, Philadelphia, Pennsylvania, U.S.	
207	Win	143–34–26 (4)	Ted 'Kid' Lewis	NWS	6	Jun 20, 1918	32 years, 249 days	Madison Square Garden, New York City, New York, U.S.	
206	Win	142–34–26 (4)	Bryan Downey	PTS	12	Jun 11, 1918	32 years, 240 days	Armory, Boston, Massachusetts, U.S.	
205	Win	141–34–26 (4)	Fighting Zunner	NWS	4	Jun 6, 1918	32 years, 235 days	Broadway Auditorium, Buffalo, New York, U.S.	
204	Win	140–34–26 (4)	Tommy Ferguson	NWS	10	May 16, 1918	32 years, 214 days	Town Hall, Scranton, Pennsylvania, U.S.	
203	Draw	139–34–26 (4)	Ted 'Kid' Lewis	NWS	10	May 2, 1918	32 years, 200 days	Town Hall, Scranton, Pennsylvania, U.S.	World welterweight title at stake; (via KO only)
202	Win	139–34–25 (4)	Lockport Jimmy Duffy	DQ	8 (10)	Mar 27, 1918	32 years, 164 days	Armory Auditorium, Atlanta, Georgia, U.S.	Won vacant American welterweight title
201	Win	138–34–25 (4)	Vic Morgan	KO	6 (8)	Mar 20, 1918	32 years, 157 days	Joe Levy's Arena, Chattanooga, Tennessee, U.S.	
200	Win	137–34–25 (4)	Ted 'Kid' Lewis	NWS	10	Mar 6, 1918	32 years, 143 days	Armory Auditorium, Atlanta, Georgia, U.S.	World welterweight title at stake; (via KO only)
199	Win	136–34–25 (4)	Marty Cross	PTS	12	Feb 11, 1918	32 years, 120 days	Marieville Gardens, North Providence, Rhode Island, U.S.	
198	Win	135–34–25 (4)	Tommy Robson	PTS	12	Jan 16, 1918	32 years, 94 days	Marieville Gardens, North Providence, Rhode Island, U.S.	
197	Win	134–34–25 (4)	Lockport Jimmy Duffy	NWS	10	Jan 1, 1918	32 years, 79 days	Broadway Auditorium, Buffalo, New York, U.S.	
196	Win	133–34–25 (4)	Johnny Tillman	PTS	12	Dec 4, 1917	32 years, 51 days	Grand Opera House, Boston, Massachusetts, U.S.	
195	Win	132–34–25 (4)	Jakob "Soldier" Bartfield	NWS	10	Nov 13, 1917	32 years, 30 days	Broadway Auditorium, Buffalo, New York, U.S.	
194	Win	131–34–25 (4)	Johnny Tillman	NWS	6	Nov 12, 1917	32 years, 29 days	Olympia A.C., Philadelphia, Pennsylvania, U.S.	
193	Loss	130–34–25 (4)	Jimmy O'Hagan	NWS	10	Nov 6, 1917	32 years, 23 days	German Hall, Albany, New York, U.S.	
192	Loss	130–33–25 (4)	Benny Leonard	NWS	10	Oct 19, 1917	32 years, 5 days	Harlem S.C., New York City, New York, U.S.	
191	Win	130–32–25 (4)	Eddie Billings	NWS	10	Oct 3, 1917	31 years, 354 days	Grand Opera House, Superior, Wisconsin, U.S.	
190	Win	129–32–25 (4)	Marty Cross	NWS	10	Sep 14, 1917	31 years, 335 days	St. Nicholas Arena, New York City, New York, U.S.	
189	Loss	128–32–25 (4)	Ted 'Kid' Lewis	PTS	20	Jun 25, 1917	31 years, 254 days	Westwood Field, Dayton, Ohio, U.S.	Lost world welterweight title
188	Loss	128–31–25 (4)	Ted 'Kid' Lewis	NWS	10	Jun 14, 1917	31 years, 243 days	St. Nicholas Arena, New York City, New York, U.S.	World welterweight title at stake; (via KO only)
187	Loss	128–30–25 (4)	Ted 'Kid' Lewis	NWS	10	Jun 6, 1917	31 years, 235 days	Coliseum, Saint Louis, Missouri, U.S.	World welterweight title at stake; (via KO only)
186	Loss	128–29–25 (4)	Ted 'Kid' Lewis	NWS	10	May 19, 1917	31 years, 217 days	Massey Hall, Toronto, Ontario, Canada	World welterweight title at stake; (via KO only)
185	Loss	128–28–25 (4)	Mike O'Dowd	NWS	10	May 8, 1917	31 years, 206 days	Broadway S.C., New York City, New York, U.S.	
184	Loss	128–27–25 (4)	Ted 'Kid' Lewis	NWS	10	Mar 26, 1917	31 years, 163 days	Heuck's Opera House, Cincinnati, Ohio, U.S.	World welterweight title at stake; (via KO only)
183	Loss	128–26–25 (4)	Bryan Downey	NWS	12	Mar 5, 1917	31 years, 142 days	Coliseum, Columbus, Ohio, U.S.	
182	Win	128–25–25 (4)	Tommy Robson	NWS	12	Mar 1, 1917	31 years, 138 days	Opera House, Lawrence, Massachusetts, U.S.	
181	Win	127–25–25 (4)	Johnny Griffiths	NWS	10	Jan 29, 1917	31 years, 107 days	Heuck's Opera House, Cincinnati, Ohio, U.S.	
180	Win	126–25–25 (4)	Mike O'Dowd	NWS	10	Jan 25, 1917	31 years, 103 days	Auditorium, Saint Paul, Minnesota, U.S.	
179	Win	125–25–25 (4)	Albert Badoud	NWS	10	Jan 10, 1917	31 years, 88 days	Manhattan Casino, New York City, New York, U.S.	World welterweight title at stake; (via KO only)
178	Win	124–25–25 (4)	Lockport Jimmy Duffy	NWS	10	Jan 1, 1917	31 years, 79 days	Broadway Auditorium, Buffalo, New York, U.S.	World welterweight title at stake; (via KO only)
177	Win	123–25–25 (4)	Sam Robideau	NWS	10	Dec 8, 1916	31 years, 55 days	Cleveland A.C., Cleveland, Ohio, U.S.	
176	Win	122–25–25 (4)	Steve Latzo	NWS	10	Dec 4, 1916	31 years, 51 days	Majestic Theatre, Wilkes-Barre, Pennsylvania, U.S.	
175	Win	121–25–25 (4)	Charley White	PTS	12	Nov 21, 1916	31 years, 38 days	Arena, Boston, Massachusetts, U.S.	Retained world welterweight title
174	Draw	120–25–25 (4)	Ted 'Kid' Lewis	PTS	12	Nov 14, 1916	31 years, 31 days	Arena, Boston, Massachusetts, U.S.	Retained world welterweight title
173	Win	120–25–24 (4)	Ted 'Kid' Lewis	PTS	12	Oct 17, 1916	31 years, 3 days	Arena, Boston, Massachusetts, U.S.	Retained world welterweight title
172	Win	119–25–24 (4)	Jimmy Coffey	NWS	10	Oct 2, 1916	30 years, 354 days	Hudson Theatre, Schenectady, New York, U.S.	
171	Win	118–25–24 (4)	Joe Welling	NWS	10	Sep 5, 1916	30 years, 327 days	Broadway Auditorium, Buffalo, New York, U.S.	World welterweight title at stake; (via KO only)
170	Draw	117–25–24 (4)	Johnny Griffiths	PTS	12	Jul 25, 1916	30 years, 285 days	Arena, Boston, Massachusetts, U.S.	
169	Loss	117–25–23 (4)	Battling Kopin	NWS	10	Jun 23, 1916	30 years, 253 days	Arena, Syracuse, New York, U.S.	
168	Win	117–24–23 (4)	Mike O'Dowd	PTS	12	Jun 6, 1916	30 years, 236 days	Arena, Boston, Massachusetts, U.S.	
167	Win	116–24–23 (4)	Ted 'Kid' Lewis	PTS	20	Apr 24, 1916	30 years, 193 days	Louisiana Auditorium, New Orleans, Louisiana, U.S.	Won world welterweight title
166	Win	115–24–23 (4)	Perry 'Kid' Graves	PTS	15	Mar 22, 1916	30 years, 160 days	Gymnastic Club, Dayton, Ohio, U.S.	
165	Win	114–24–23 (4)	Willie K.O. Brennan	NWS	10	Mar 13, 1916	30 years, 151 days	Broadway Auditorium, Buffalo, New York, U.S.	
164	Win	113–24–23 (4)	Ted 'Kid' Lewis	NWS	10	Feb 15, 1916	30 years, 124 days	Broadway Arena, New York City, New York, U.S.	
163	Win	112–24–23 (4)	Silent Martin	NWS	10	Feb 5, 1916	30 years, 114 days	Clermont Avenue Rink, New York City, New York, U.S.	
162	Win	111–24–23 (4)	Hilliard Lang	NWS	6	Jan 21, 1916	30 years, 99 days	Riverdale Rink, Toronto, Ontario, Canada	
161	Win	110–24–23 (4)	Ted 'Kid' Lewis	NWS	10	Jan 20, 1916	30 years, 98 days	Broadway Auditorium, Buffalo, New York, U.S.	World welterweight title at stake; (via KO only)
160	Loss	109–24–23 (4)	Johnny Griffiths	NWS	12	Dec 28, 1915	30 years, 75 days	Winter Garden, Akron, Ohio, U.S.	
159	Win	109–23–23 (4)	Terry Mitchell	NWS	10	Oct 30, 1915	30 years, 16 days	Clermont Avenue Rink, New York City, New York, U.S.	
158	Loss	108–23–23 (4)	Ted 'Kid' Lewis	PTS	12	Sep 28, 1915	29 years, 349 days	Arena (Atlas A.A.), Boston, Massachusetts, U.S.	For world welterweight title
157	Draw	108–22–23 (4)	Johnny Griffiths	NWS	12	Sep 6, 1915	29 years, 327 days	League Park, Canton, Ohio, U.S.	
156	Loss	108–22–22 (4)	Ted 'Kid' Lewis	PTS	12	Aug 31, 1915	29 years, 321 days	Arena, Boston, Massachusetts, U.S.	Lost world welterweight title
155	Win	108–21–22 (4)	Mike Glover	PTS	12	Jun 22, 1915	29 years, 251 days	Arena (Atlas A.A.), Boston, Massachusetts, U.S.	Won world welterweight title
154	Win	107–21–22 (4)	Young Denny	NWS	10	Jun 1, 1915	29 years, 230 days	Heuck's Opera House, Cincinnati, Ohio, U.S.	
153	Win	106–21–22 (4)	Leo Kelly	NWS	10	May 17, 1915	29 years, 215 days	Coliseum, Columbus, Ohio, U.S.	
152	Win	105–21–22 (4)	Ray Campbell	NWS	10	Apr 5, 1915	29 years, 173 days	Garden Theater, Buffalo, New York, U.S.	
151	Win	104–21–22 (4)	Ted 'Kid' Lewis	NWS	10	Mar 26, 1915	29 years, 163 days	135th Street A.C., New York City, New York, U.S.	
150	Win	103–21–22 (4)	Phil Bloom	NWS	10	Mar 13, 1915	29 years, 150 days	Irving A.C., New York City, New York, U.S.	
149	Win	102–21–22 (4)	Jack Toland	NWS	10	Mar 6, 1915	29 years, 143 days	Broadway S.C., New York City, New York, U.S.	
148	Win	101–21–22 (4)	Perry 'Kid' Graves	NWS	10	Jan 30, 1915	29 years, 108 days	Broadway S.C., New York City, New York, U.S.	
147	Win	100–21–22 (4)	Frankie Notter	NWS	10	Jan 9, 1915	29 years, 87 days	Broadway S.C., New York City, New York, U.S.	
146	Win	99–21–22 (4)	Al Dewey	NWS	10	Dec 28, 1914	29 years, 75 days	Majestic Theatre, Wilkes-Barre, Pennsylvania, U.S.	
145	Win	98–21–22 (4)	Joe Hyland	PTS	12	Dec 25, 1914	29 years, 72 days	Hanna Armory, New Britain, Connecticut, U.S.	
144	Loss	97–21–22 (4)	Jakob "Soldier" Bartfield	NWS	10	Nov 26, 1914	28 years, 135 days	Broadway Arena, New York City, New York, U.S.	
143	Win	97–20–22 (4)	Eddie Moran	PTS	12	Nov 2, 1914	29 years, 19 days	Hanna Armory, New Britain, Connecticut, U.S.	
142	Win	96–20–22 (4)	Eddie Moran	NWS	10	Oct 9, 1914	28 years, 360 days	Ridgewood Grove SC, New York City, New York, U.S.	
141	Win	95–20–22 (4)	Jakob "Soldier" Bartfield	NWS	10	Sep 26, 1914	28 years, 347 days	Broadway Arena, New York City, New York, U.S.	
140	Win	94–20–22 (4)	Johnny Griffiths	NWS	12	Jul 4, 1914	28 years, 263 days	League Park, Canton, Ohio, U.S.	
139	Win	93–20–22 (4)	Joe Eagan	KO	4 (12)	Jun 30, 1914	28 years, 259 days	Arena (Atlas A.A.), Boston, Massachusetts, U.S.	
138	Win	92–20–22 (4)	Perry 'Kid' Graves	NWS	6	Apr 25, 1914	28 years, 193 days	National A.C., Philadelphia, Pennsylvania, U.S.	
137	Win	91–20–22 (4)	Billy Griffith	NWS	10	Apr 13, 1914	28 years, 181 days	Heuck's Opera House, Cincinnati, Ohio, U.S.	
136	Win	90–20–22 (4)	Leo Kelly	NWS	8	Mar 30, 1914	28 years, 167 days	Coliseum, Saint Louis, Missouri, U.S.	
135	Win	89–20–22 (4)	Perry 'Kid' Graves	NWS	10	Mar 10, 1914	28 years, 147 days	Broadway A.C., New York City, New York, U.S.	
134	Win	88–20–22 (4)	Joe Hirst	NWS	6	Mar 7, 1914	28 years, 144 days	National A.C., Philadelphia, Pennsylvania, U.S.	
133	Win	87–20–22 (4)	Frankie Madden	NWS	10	Feb 24, 1914	28 years, 133 days	Atlantic Garden A.C., New York City, New York, U.S.	
132	Win	86–20–22 (4)	Gene Moriarty	TKO	7 (10)	Feb 17, 1914	28 years, 126 days	Broadway S.C., New York City, New York, U.S.	
131	Win	85–20–22 (4)	Johnny Dohan	NWS	10	Feb 10, 1914	28 years, 119 days	Irving A.C., New York City, New York, U.S.	
130	Win	84–20–22 (4)	Ray Campbell	NWS	10	Jan 31, 1914	28 years, 109 days	Irving A.C., New York City, New York, U.S.	
129	Win	83–20–22 (4)	Mike Glover	NWS	10	Jan 19, 1914	28 years, 97 days	New Amsterdam Opera House, New York City, New York, U.S.	World welterweight title claim at stake; (via KO only)
128	Win	82–20–22 (4)	Phil Bloom	NWS	10	Jan 5, 1914	28 years, 83 days	Madison Square Garden, New York City, New York, U.S.	
127	Draw	81–20–22 (4)	Al Dewey	NWS	10	Dec 29, 1913	28 years, 76 days	Peerless A.C., Wilkes-Barre, Pennsylvania, U.S.	
126	Loss	81–20–21 (4)	Packey McFarland	NWS	10	Dec 8, 1913	28 years, 55 days	Auditorium, Milwaukee, Wisconsin, U.S.	
125	Loss	81–19–21 (4)	Mike Glover	NWS	10	Nov 27, 1913	28 years, 44 days	Irving A.C., New York City, New York, U.S.	World welterweight title claim at stake; (via KO only)
124	Win	81–18–21 (4)	Battling Gates	KO	3 (10)	Nov 21, 1913	28 years, 38 days	Coliseum A.C., Wilkes-Barre, Pennsylvania, U.S.	
123	Win	80–18–21 (4)	Charley White	TKO	18 (20)	Jul 4, 1913	27 years, 263 days	McDonoghville Park, New Orleans, Louisiana, U.S.	
122	Loss	79–18–21 (4)	Lockport Jimmy Duffy	NWS	10	Jun 23, 1913	27 years, 252 days	Broadway Auditorium, Buffalo, New York, U.S.	
121	Loss	79–17–21 (4)	Lockport Jimmy Duffy	DQ	6 (10)	May 29, 1913	27 years, 227 days	Broadway Auditorium, Buffalo, New York, U.S.	Low Blow
120	Draw	79–16–21 (4)	Eddie Murphy	NWS	10	May 20, 1913	27 years, 218 days	Kenosha, Wisconsin, U.S.	
119	Win	79–16–20 (4)	Perry 'Kid' Graves	NWS	6	May 17, 1913	27 years, 215 days	National A.C., Philadelphia, Pennsylvania, U.S.	
118	Win	78–16–20 (4)	Johnny Dohan	NWS	10	Apr 22, 1913	27 years, 190 days	Irving A.C., New York City, New York, U.S.	
117	NC	77–16–20 (4)	Philadelphia Pal Moore	NC	4 (6)	Apr 21, 1913	27 years, 189 days	Olympia A.C., Philadelphia, Pennsylvania, U.S.	Referee stopped this bout because he felt Britton wasn't trying
116	Win	77–16–20 (3)	Matty Baldwin	NWS	10	Apr 15, 1913	27 years, 183 days	St. Nicholas Arena, New York City, New York, U.S.	
115	Win	76–16–20 (3)	Kid Curley	TKO	3 (6)	Mar 31, 1913	27 years, 168 days	Olympia A.C., Philadelphia, Pennsylvania, U.S.	
114	Win	75–16–20 (3)	Young Abe Brown	NWS	10	Mar 20, 1913	27 years, 157 days	Atlantic Garden A.C., New York City, New York, U.S.	
113	Win	74–16–20 (3)	Johnny Krause	NWS	6	Mar 17, 1913	27 years, 154 days	Olympia A.C., Philadelphia, Pennsylvania, U.S.	
112	Loss	73–16–20 (3)	Packey McFarland	NWS	10	Mar 7, 1913	27 years, 144 days	Madison Square Garden, New York City, New York, U.S.	
111	Win	73–15–20 (3)	Eddie Hanlon	TKO	6 (15)	Jan 31, 1913	27 years, 109 days	Southern A.C., Savannah, Georgia, U.S.	
110	Win	72–15–20 (3)	Jimmy Evans	TKO	7 (8)	Jan 27, 1913	27 years, 105 days	Phoenix A.C., Memphis, Tennessee, U.S.	
109	Win	71–15–20 (3)	Frankie Gage	KO	9 (10)	Jan 18, 1913	27 years, 96 days	Olympia A.C., New Orleans, Louisiana, U.S.	
108	Win	70–15–20 (3)	Joe Thomas	PTS	10	Jan 10, 1913	27 years, 88 days	Olympia A.C., New Orleans, Louisiana, U.S.	
107	Win	69–15–20 (3)	Tommy O'Keefe	KO	2 (6)	Dec 25, 1912	27 years, 72 days	Olympia A.C., Philadelphia, Pennsylvania, U.S.	
106	Draw	68–15–20 (3)	Young Ahearn	NWS	10	Dec 23, 1912	27 years, 70 days	Clermont Avenue Rink, New York City, New York, U.S.	
105	Win	68–15–19 (3)	Frankie Nelson	NWS	10	Dec 17, 1912	27 years, 64 days	Brown's Gym A.A., Far Rockaway, New York City, New York, U.S.	
104	Win	67–15–19 (3)	Frank Loughrey	NWS	6	Dec 6, 1912	27 years, 53 days	Olympia A.C., Philadelphia, Pennsylvania, U.S.	
103	Win	66–15–19 (3)	Billy Bennett	TKO	10 (10)	Dec 5, 1912	27 years, 52 days	Clermont Avenue Rink, New York City, New York, U.S.	
102	Win	65–15–19 (3)	Milburn Saylor	TKO	8 (?)	Nov 28, 1912	27 years, 45 days	Lakeside A.C., Dayton, Ohio, U.S.	
101	Win	64–15–19 (3)	Freddie Duffy	NWS	10	Oct 24, 1912	27 years, 10 days	Forty-Fourth Street A.C., New York City, New York, U.S.	
100	Win	63–15–19 (3)	Leach Cross	NWS	10	Oct 11, 1912	26 years, 363 days	St. Nicholas Arena, New York City, New York, U.S.	
99	Draw	62–15–19 (3)	Young McDonough	PTS	12	Oct 7, 1912	26 years, 359 days	Rhode Island A.C., Thornton, Rhode Island, U.S.	
98	Win	62–15–18 (3)	Joe Eagan	TKO	4 (10)	Oct 2, 1912	26 years, 354 days	St. Nicholas Arena, New York City, New York, U.S.	
97	Win	61–15–18 (3)	Jack Redmond	NWS	10	Sep 24, 1912	26 years, 346 days	New Star A.C., New York City, New York, U.S.	
96	Win	60–15–18 (3)	Milburn Saylor	DQ	6 (12)	Sep 17, 1912	26 years, 339 days	Arena, Boston, Massachusetts, U.S.	
95	Win	59–15–18 (3)	Willie Beecher	NWS	10	Sep 10, 1912	26 years, 332 days	St. Nicholas Arena, New York City, New York, U.S.	
94	Win	58–15–18 (3)	Eddie Murphy	TKO	11 (12)	Aug 27, 1912	26 years, 318 days	Arena, Boston, Massachusetts, U.S.	
93	Win	57–15–18 (3)	Eddie Smith	NWS	10	Aug 12, 1912	26 years, 303 days	Madison Square Garden, New York City, New York, U.S.	
92	Win	56–15–18 (3)	Harry Stone	NWS	10	Jul 17, 1912	26 years, 277 days	St. Nicholas Arena, New York City, New York, U.S.	
91	Win	55–15–18 (3)	Philadelphia Pal Moore	PTS	20	Apr 30, 1912	26 years, 199 days	Dreamland Rink, San Francisco, California, U.S.	
90	Win	54–15–18 (3)	Oakland Frankie Burns	PTS	10	Jan 24, 1912	26 years, 102 days	Piedmont Pavilion, Oakland, California, U.S.	
89	Win	53–15–18 (3)	Al Rogers	PTS	10	Jan 5, 1912	26 years, 83 days	Dreamland Rink, San Francisco, California, U.S.	
88	Draw	52–15–18 (3)	Ray Temple	PTS	4	Dec 8, 1911	26 years, 55 days	Dreamland Rink, San Francisco, California, U.S.	
87	Win	52–15–17 (3)	Johnny McCarthy	PTS	10	Oct 14, 1911	26 years, 0 days	Diepenbrock Theater, Sacramento, California, U.S.	
86	Loss	51–15–17 (3)	Willie Ritchie	PTS	4	Oct 6, 1911	25 years, 357 days	Dreamland Rink, San Francisco, California, U.S.	
85	Win	51–14–17 (3)	Danny O'Brien	KO	1 (4)	Sep 22, 1911	25 years, 343 days	Dreamland Rink, San Francisco, California, U.S.	
84	Loss	50–14–17 (3)	Jerry Murphy	PTS	4	Sep 8, 1911	25 years, 329 days	Dreamland Rink, San Francisco, California, U.S.	
83	Win	50–13–17 (3)	Johnny Marto	NWS	10	May 9, 1911	25 years, 207 days	St. Nicholas Arena, New York City, New York, U.S.	
82	Win	49–13–17 (3)	Jake Barada	PTS	15	Apr 21, 1911	25 years, 189 days	Business Men's A.C., Saint Joseph, Missouri, U.S.	
81	Draw	48–13–17 (3)	Packey McFarland	PTS	8	Jan 30, 1911	25 years, 108 days	Armory AC, Memphis, Tennessee, U.S.	
80	Win	48–13–16 (3)	Ray Temple	PTS	8	Dec 12, 1910	25 years, 59 days	National A.C., Memphis, Tennessee, U.S.	
79	Win	47–13–16 (3)	Farmer 'Kid' Dorbett	PTS	8	Nov 21, 1910	25 years, 38 days	National A.C., Memphis, Tennessee, U.S.	
78	Draw	46–13–16 (3)	Milburn Saylor	PTS	8	Nov 14, 1910	25 years, 31 days	National A.C., Memphis, Tennessee, U.S.	
77	Win	46–13–15 (3)	Bert Keyes	PTS	15	Nov 12, 1910	25 years, 29 days	Southern A.C., Savannah, Georgia, U.S.	
76	Win	45–13–15 (3)	Jack McGuire	KO	7 (10)	Aug 19, 1910	24 years, 309 days	Savannah Theater, Savannah, Georgia, U.S.	
75	Loss	44–13–15 (3)	Ray Bronson	PTS	10	Jun 30, 1910	24 years, 259 days	Royal A.C., New Orleans, Louisiana, U.S.	
74	Draw	44–12–15 (3)	Tommy Devlin	PTS	10	Jun 17, 1910	24 years, 246 days	Savannah Theater, Savannah, Georgia, U.S.	
73	Draw	44–12–14 (3)	Dummy Decker	PTS	15	May 7, 1910	24 years, 205 days	Southern A.C., Savannah, Georgia, U.S.	
72	Draw	44–12–13 (3)	Frankie White	PTS	10	May 5, 1910	24 years, 203 days	Monroe A.C., Atlanta, Georgia, U.S.	
71	Win	44–12–12 (3)	Dummy Decker	PTS	15	Apr 18, 1910	24 years, 186 days	Southern A.C., Savannah, Georgia, U.S.	
70	Win	43–12–12 (3)	Jimmy Dasher	PTS	15	Mar 26, 1910	24 years, 163 days	Southern A.C., Savannah, Georgia, U.S.	
69	Win	42–12–12 (3)	Mike Memsic	PTS	10	Mar 22, 1910	24 years, 159 days	Academy A.C., Atlanta, Georgia, U.S.	
68	Win	41–12–12 (3)	Jack Curley	PTS	15	Mar 18, 1910	24 years, 155 days	Southern A.C., Savannah, Georgia, U.S.	
67	Loss	40–12–12 (3)	Young Erne	NWS	6	Feb 22, 1910	24 years, 131 days	Douglas A.C., Philadelphia, Pennsylvania, U.S.	
66	Win	40–11–12 (3)	Harry Cutch	NWS	6	Jan 25, 1910	24 years, 103 days	Douglas A.C., Philadelphia, Pennsylvania, U.S.	
65	Win	39–11–12 (3)	Patsy Hogan	TKO	14 (15)	Dec 17, 1909	24 years, 64 days	Southern A.C., Savannah, Georgia, U.S.	
64	Win	38–11–12 (3)	Farmer 'Kid' Dorbett	TKO	7 (15)	Dec 9, 1909	24 years, 56 days	Southern A.C., Savannah, Georgia, U.S.	
63	Loss	37–11–12 (3)	Farmer 'Kid' Dorbett	DQ	3 (15)	Dec 3, 1909	24 years, 50 days	Southern A.C., Savannah, Georgia, U.S.	
62	Win	37–10–12 (3)	Harry Stone	NWS	6	Nov 29, 1909	24 years, 46 days	New Philadelphia A.C., Philadelphia, Pennsylvania, U.S.	
61	Loss	36–10–12 (3)	Tommy O'Keefe	NWS	6	Nov 15, 1909	24 years, 32 days	New Philadelphia A.C., Philadelphia, Pennsylvania, U.S.	
60	Win	36–9–12 (3)	Nathan Ehrlich	NWS	6	Oct 25, 1909	24 years, 11 days	New Philadelphia A.C., Philadelphia, Pennsylvania, U.S.	
59	Win	35–9–12 (3)	Joe Sieger	NWS	10	Sep 9, 1909	23 years, 330 days	Long Acre A.C., New York City, New York, U.S.	
58	Win	34–9–12 (3)	Jimmy Dasher	TKO	6 (15)	Jun 18, 1909	23 years, 247 days	Southern A.C., Savannah, Georgia, U.S.	
57	Win	33–9–12 (3)	Jim Holland	KO	4 (15)	Jun 11, 1909	23 years, 240 days	Southern A.C., Savannah, Georgia, U.S.	
56	Draw	32–9–12 (3)	Leo Houck	NWS	6	Mar 18, 1909	23 years, 155 days	Lancaster A.C., Lancaster, Pennsylvania, U.S.	
55	Win	32–9–11 (3)	Joe Hirst	NWS	6	Mar 17, 1909	23 years, 154 days	Washington S.C., Philadelphia, Pennsylvania, U.S.	
54	Win	31–9–11 (3)	Johnny Hogan	NWS	6	Feb 25, 1909	23 years, 134 days	Reading, Pennsylvania, U.S.	
53	Draw	30–9–11 (3)	Leo Houck	NWS	6	Feb 4, 1909	23 years, 113 days	Lancaster A.C., Lancaster, Pennsylvania, U.S.	
52	Win	30–9–10 (3)	Dimp O'Donnell	NWS	6	Feb 3, 1909	23 years, 112 days	Wayne A.C., Philadelphia, Pennsylvania, U.S.	
51	Win	29–9–10 (3)	Charley 'Twin' Miller	NWS	6	Jan 4, 1909	23 years, 82 days	Washington S.C., Philadelphia, Pennsylvania, U.S.	
50	Loss	28–9–10 (3)	Reddy Moore	NWS	6	Dec 14, 1908	23 years, 61 days	West End A.C., Philadelphia, Pennsylvania, U.S.	
49	Draw	28–8–10 (3)	Al Grander	NWS	6	Dec 5, 1908	23 years, 52 days	National A.C., Philadelphia, Pennsylvania, U.S.	
48	Win	28–8–9 (3)	Mike Fleming	NWS	6	Nov 14, 1908	23 years, 31 days	National A.C., Philadelphia, Pennsylvania, U.S.	
47	Draw	27–8–9 (3)	Joe Thiel	NWS	6	Nov 6, 1908	23 years, 23 days	State A.C., Philadelphia, Pennsylvania, U.S.	
46	Win	27–8–8 (3)	Johnny Johnson	NWS	6	Oct 23, 1908	23 years, 9 days	State A.C., Philadelphia, Pennsylvania, U.S.	
45	Loss	26–8–8 (3)	Reddy Moore	NWS	6	Oct 20, 1908	23 years, 6 days	Douglas A.C., Philadelphia, Pennsylvania, U.S.	
44	ND	26–7–8 (3)	Tommy Carey	ND	6	Oct 10, 1908	N/A	Location unknown	Exact date and location unknown
43	Win	26–7–8 (2)	Percy Cove	NWS	6	Jul 15, 1908	22 years, 275 days	Princess A.C., New York City, New York, U.S.	
42	Draw	25–7–8 (2)	Willie Riley	NWS	6	Jul 11, 1908	22 years, 271 days	Navarre A.C., Ulmer Park, New York City, New York, U.S.	
41	Win	25–7–7 (2)	Johnny Dwyer	NWS	6	Jul 2, 1908	22 years, 262 days	Olympia A.C., New York City, New York, U.S.	
40	Win	24–7–7 (2)	Percy Cove	NWS	6	Jul 1, 1908	22 years, 261 days	Princess A.C., New York City, New York, U.S.	
39	Win	23–7–7 (2)	Johnny Regan	KO	2 (10)	Jun 30, 1908	22 years, 260 days	Navarre A.C., Ulmer Park, New York City, New York, U.S.	
38	Win	22–7–7 (2)	Johnny Dwyer	NWS	6	Jun 23, 1908	22 years, 253 days	Navarre A.C., Ulmer Park, New York City, New York, U.S.	
37	Loss	21–7–7 (2)	Bill Glover	NWS	6	Jun 1, 1908	22 years, 231 days	Dry Dock A.C., New York City, New York, U.S.	
36	ND	21–6–7 (2)	Young Farrell	ND	6	May 5, 1908	N/A	Location unknown	Exact date and location unknown
35	Loss	21–6–7 (1)	Phil Griffin	NWS	6	Apr 4, 1908	22 years, 173 days	National A.C., Philadelphia, Pennsylvania, U.S.	
34	Win	21–5–7 (1)	Art Edmunds	NWS	6	Feb 27, 1908	22 years, 136 days	Long Acre A.C., New York City, New York, U.S.	
33	Win	20–5–7 (1)	Lew Sheppard	NWS	6	Feb 6, 1908	22 years, 115 days	Long Acre A.C., New York City, New York, U.S.	
32	Win	19–5–7 (1)	Tommy Love	NWS	6	Jan 28, 1908	22 years, 106 days	Reading A.C., Reading, Pennsylvania, U.S.	
31	Win	18–5–7 (1)	Phil Griffin	NWS	6	Jan 6, 1908	22 years, 84 days	Spring Garden A.C., Philadelphia, Pennsylvania, U.S.	
30	Win	17–5–7 (1)	Battling Stinger	NWS	10	Dec 25, 1907	22 years, 72 days	Wilmington, Delaware, U.S.	
29	Loss	16–5–7 (1)	Willie Lucas	NWS	6	Dec 10, 1907	22 years, 57 days	Bijou Theater, Reading, Pennsylvania, U.S.	
28	Win	16–4–7 (1)	Tony Haney	NWS	6	Dec 9, 1907	22 years, 56 days	Spring Garden A.C., Philadelphia, Pennsylvania, U.S.	
27	Loss	15–4–7 (1)	Kid Beebe	NWS	6	Nov 25, 1907	22 years, 42 days	Landmessers Hall, Wilkes-Barre, Pennsylvania, U.S.	
26	Draw	15–3–7 (1)	Tony Haney	NWS	6	Nov 19, 1907	22 years, 36 days	Bijou Theater, Reading, Pennsylvania, U.S.	
25	Draw	15–3–6 (1)	Bobby O'Neill	NWS	6	Nov 11, 1907	22 years, 28 days	Spring Garden A.C., Philadelphia, Pennsylvania, U.S.	
24	Win	15–3–5 (1)	Kid Haney	NWS	6	Nov 9, 1907	22 years, 26 days	National A.C., Philadelphia, Pennsylvania, U.S.	
23	Win	14–3–5 (1)	Young Bechtel	KO	2 (6)	Nov 5, 1907	22 years, 22 days	Bijou Theater, Reading, Pennsylvania, U.S.	
22	Win	13–3–5 (1)	Eddie Carton	NWS	6	Nov 4, 1907	22 years, 21 days	Spring Garden A.C., Philadelphia, Pennsylvania, U.S.	
21	Win	12–3–5 (1)	Young Kid Broad	NWS	6	Oct 21, 1907	22 years, 7 days	Spring Garden A.C., Philadelphia, Pennsylvania, U.S.	
20	Win	11–3–5 (1)	Eddie O'Neil	NWS	6	Sep 20, 1907	21 years, 341 days	Paddock A.C., New York City, New York, U.S.	
19	Win	10–3–5 (1)	Mississippi	NWS	6	Sep 10, 1907	21 years, 331 days	Consolidated A.C., New York City, New York, U.S.	
18	Win	9–3–5 (1)	Terry Young	NWS	6	Sep 9, 1907	21 years, 330 days	Crown A.C., Clermont Rink, New York City, New York, U.S.	
17	Draw	8–3–5 (1)	Farmer 'Kid' Dorbett	PTS	6	Jun 19, 1907	21 years, 248 days	Gayety Theater, Baltimore, Maryland, U.S.	
16	Draw	8–3–4 (1)	Young Pierce	NWS	6	Jun 5, 1907	21 years, 234 days	Wayne A.C., Philadelphia, Pennsylvania, U.S.	
15	Win	8–3–3 (1)	Kid Gilbert	TKO	3 (6)	May 24, 1907	21 years, 222 days	National S.C., Wilmington, Delaware, U.S.	
14	Win	7–3–3 (1)	Joe Smith	NWS	6	May 17, 1907	21 years, 215 days	New Penn Art A.C., Philadelphia, Pennsylvania, U.S.	
13	Draw	6–3–3 (1)	Kid Hogan	NWS	6	Mar 9, 1907	21 years, 146 days	National A.C., Philadelphia, Pennsylvania, U.S.	
12	Win	6–3–2 (1)	Young Karl	NWS	6	Jan 25, 1907	21 years, 103 days	Wayne A.C., Philadelphia, Pennsylvania, U.S.	
11	Draw	5–3–2 (1)	Eddie Fay	NWS	6	Jan 12, 1907	21 years, 90 days	National A.C., Philadelphia, Pennsylvania, U.S.	
10	ND	5–3–1 (1)	Tommy Herman	ND	6	Dec 1, 1906	21 years, 48 days	Location unknown	
9	Loss	5–3–1	Leo Houck	NWS	6	Oct 18, 1906	21 years, 4 days	Lancaster A.C., Lancaster, Pennsylvania, U.S.	
8	Draw	5–2–1	Young Loughrey	NWS	6	Apr 18, 1906	20 years, 186 days	National S.C., Wilmington, Delaware, U.S.	
7	Win	5–2	Jimmy Earle	PTS	6	Mar 28, 1906	20 years, 165 days	National S.C., Wilmington, Delaware, U.S.	
6	Win	4–2	Todo Moran	NWS	6	Feb 17, 1906	20 years, 126 days	National A.C., Philadelphia, Pennsylvania, U.S.	
5	Win	3–2	Eddie Wallace	PTS	6	Feb 14, 1906	20 years, 123 days	National S.C., Wilmington, Delaware, U.S.	
4	Win	2–2	Young Loughrey	NWS	6	Jan 1, 1906	20 years, 79 days	National S.C., Wilmington, Delaware, U.S.	
3	Loss	1–2	Steve Kinney	KO	1 (6)	Oct 20, 1905	20 years, 6 days	Panorama Building, Milwaukee, Wisconsin, U.S.	
2	Loss	1–1	Tommy Shea	PTS	6	Oct 7, 1905	19 years, 358 days	Chicago A.A., Chicago, Illinois, U.S.	
1	Win	1–0	Jack Nolan	PTS	6	Nov 11, 1904	19 years, 28 days	Badger A.C., Milwaukee, Wisconsin, U.S.	

== Titles in boxing ==
=== Major world titles ===
- World welterweight champion (147 lbs) (3×)
- NYSAC welterweight champion (Note: Inaugural champion.) (147 lbs)
- NBA (WBA) welterweight champion (147 lbs)

=== Regional/International titles ===
- American welterweight champion (147 lbs)

=== Undisputed titles ===
- Undisputed welterweight champion (Note: First undisputed welterweight champion.)

== See also ==
- Lineal championship
- List of welterweight boxing champions

== Notes and references ==
=== References ===
Achievements
Preceded by Mike Glover	World Welterweight Champion; June 22, 1915 – August 31, 1915	Succeeded by Kid Lewis
Preceded by Kid Lewis	World Welterweight Champion; April 24, 1916 – June 25, 1917	Succeeded by Kid Lewis
Preceded by Kid Lewis	World Welterweight Champion; March 17, 1919 – November 1, 1922	Succeeded by Mickey Walker
