= Dave Palitz =

American boxer (1891-1940)

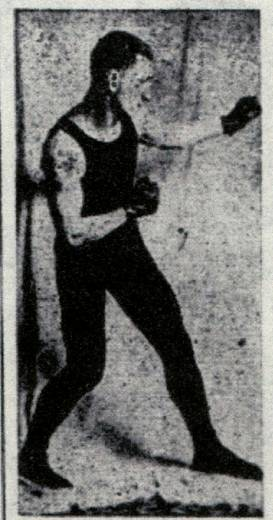
- Palitz in 1920

Personal information
- Nicknames: K. O. Palitz; Knockout Palitz; Kid Palitz
- Nationality: American
- Born: January 1, 1891 Wilkes-Barre, Pennsylvania
- Died: November 17, 1940 (aged 49) Connecticut
- Weight: Welterweight

Boxing career
- Stance: Orthodox

Boxing record
- Total fights: 77
- Wins: 40
- Win by KO: 11
- Losses: 21
- Draws: 57
- No contests: 31

Dave Palitz (January 1, 1891 – November 17, 1940) was a Welterweight boxer who competed for the Connecticut Welterweight Championship against Lou Bogash on April 26, 1920, at Casino Hall in Bridgeport, Connecticut. Though he lost the 12 round bout, Palitz was an exceptional boxer in his own right. He fought Jeff Doherty, Bunny Ford, Terry Mitchell, and Jack Britton. Doherty and Ford were regional lightweight champions while Mitchell was a boxer of such caliber that he once defeated 1906 World Welterweight Champion William "Honey" Melody. Britton held the World Welterweight championship for over four years during Palitz's career.

== Early life ==
Palitz grew up in the Heights section of Wilkes-Barre, Pennsylvania, and worked in his youth as a newsie delivering newspapers. He served in the U. S. Army for three years, where he learned the boxing trade, and fought his earliest professional bout with a Soldier Ferguson. During his early professional boxing career he moved to New London, Connecticut. Palitz was of Jewish ancestry according to the Hank Kaplan archives.

== Boxing career ==
Palitz began his more competitive boxing career by early 1911 fighting Young Ferguson twice in New London, defeating him in a fourth-round knockout in their first meeting in New London in January 1911.

Bunny Ford, who Palitz defeated three times in ten-round matches between 1913 and 1914 in Connecticut, was a noted regional lightweight. Ford competed for the New England Lightweight Title in 1909 against Jack Doherty, and officially for the Connecticut State Lightweight Title against Battling Kunz on November 27, 1916, losing in an eight-round TKO in New Haven.

In November and December 1912, he fought two ten round bouts with Brooklyn welterweight Terry Mitchell, at Lawrence Hall in New London, Connecticut, where at least one source considered him to have the edge in both close no decision bouts. Mitchell was a welterweight of the caliber to have boxed Jack Britton, Welterweight champion William "Honey" Mellody, and Bunny Ford.

In March 1915, Palitz received a rare knockout from Dave Powers of Malden, Massachusetts. This defeat did not affect the long term boxing aspirations of Palitz, who may have learned from it, as he faced far more skilled opponents in the coming years.

On September 6, 1915, Palitz fought Abe Hollandersky in Aborn Hall in New London, in a dominating twenty round victory. New London's The Day gave only one round to Hollandersky in their newspaper decision. Palitz fought New London welterweight Hollandersky four times in paid bouts, and several more times in exhibitions.

In 1916 Palitz worked for a period at the Marlin Fire Arms Company in New London along with frequent opponent and lightweight champion Bunny Ford.

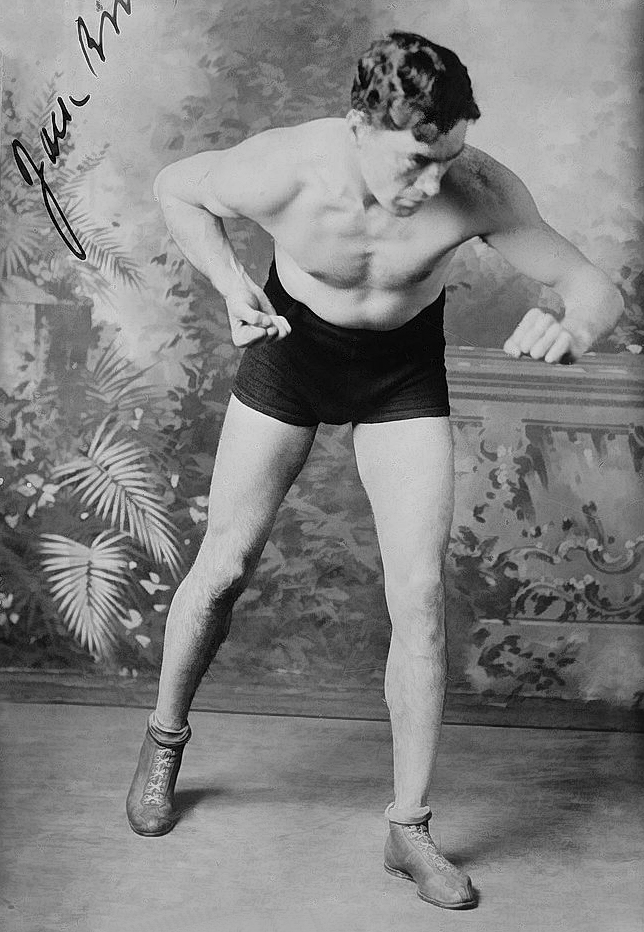
Jack Britton, Welterweight World Champion

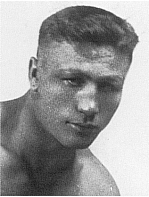
Lou Bogash, State Welterweight Champion

Easily one of the greatest fighters Palitz met was welterweight champion Jack Britton to whom he lost on March 8, 1920, in a ten-round newspaper decision in Hartford, Connecticut. Britton held the World Welterweight title three times in 1915, 1916, and from 1919 to 1922 and held it at the time of his bout with Palitz. Palitz's bout with Britton came as a warm up for his attempt at the Connecticut State Welterweight title.

One of Palitz's most publicized fights was his losing bout with World Boxing Hall of Fame inductee Lou Bogash for the Connecticut Welterweight State Title in April 1920. It is worth noting that Bogash was at the top of his career during the bout, at a youthful 19 years of age, while Palitz was nearly 30, old for a boxer, and nearing the end of his more competitive career.

== Later boxing career ==
On November 16, 1922, Palitz lost to Mike Morley in a close twelve round bout. Morley was a competent regional welterweight who had lost the New England Welterweight Title in ten rounds to Eddie Shevlin on November 15, 1921, in Boston Massachusetts. One year later in Hartford, in December 1922, Palitz won a ten-round bout with Young Marcel, a relative unknown. A local newspaper that covered the bout noted that Palitz's career had begun to wain since his loss to Lou Bogash for the Connecticut Welterweight championship in April 1920.

On April 16, 1932, a committee announced that a live bout boxing benefit would be held in New London for "invalid" Dave Palitz. Palitz died at the age of forty-nine.
