= Costovertebral =

Costovertebral may refer to:

- Costovertebral joints, the articulations that connect the heads of the ribs with the bodies of the thoracic vertebrae
- Costovertebral angle, the acute angle formed on either side of the human back between the twelfth rib and the vertebral column
- Costovertebral angle tenderness, a medical sign of renal infection or renal stone
