= CMO =

CMO may refer to:

== Business ==
- Chief marketing officer
- Chief medical officer, the senior government official designated head of medical services
- Chief merchandising officer
- Collateralized mortgage obligation, a type of complex debt security
- Contract manufacturing organization, a pharmaceutical manufacturing outsourcing organization
- Collective management organization, an organisation that manages intellectual property rights, like copyrights, on behalf of rightsholders.

== Organizations ==
- Chicago, St. Paul, Minneapolis and Omaha Railway
- Chi Mei Optoelectronics, producer of TFT LCD panels
- Citizens' Municipal Organisation, Australian political organisation
- Commodore's Messenger Organization, a high-ranking group with the Scientology Sea Organisation
- Congressional caucus or congressional member organization

== Science and engineering ==
- Central massive object at the center of a galaxy, either a supermassive black hole, or a nuclear star cluster
- Cetyl myristoleate, a type of fatty acid ester
- Corticosterone 18-monooxygenase, an enzyme involved in steroid hormone metabolism
- Cubic mile of oil, a global-scale measure of energy, roughly equal to the amount of oil consumed worldwide each year
- Comfort measures only, a medical abbreviation for an end-of-life care instruction

== Other uses ==
- Canadian Mathematical Olympiad
- Chinese Mathematical Olympiad
- Cyprus Mathematical Olympiad, organised by the Cyprus Mathematical Society
- CAMPUS Magazine Online
- Check Mii Out, channel for the Wii
- Civil-military operations, activities of a military force
- Command: Modern Operations, commercial wargaming software

== See also ==
- CMOS (disambiguation)
