= Freddie Welsh =

Welsh boxer (1886–1927)

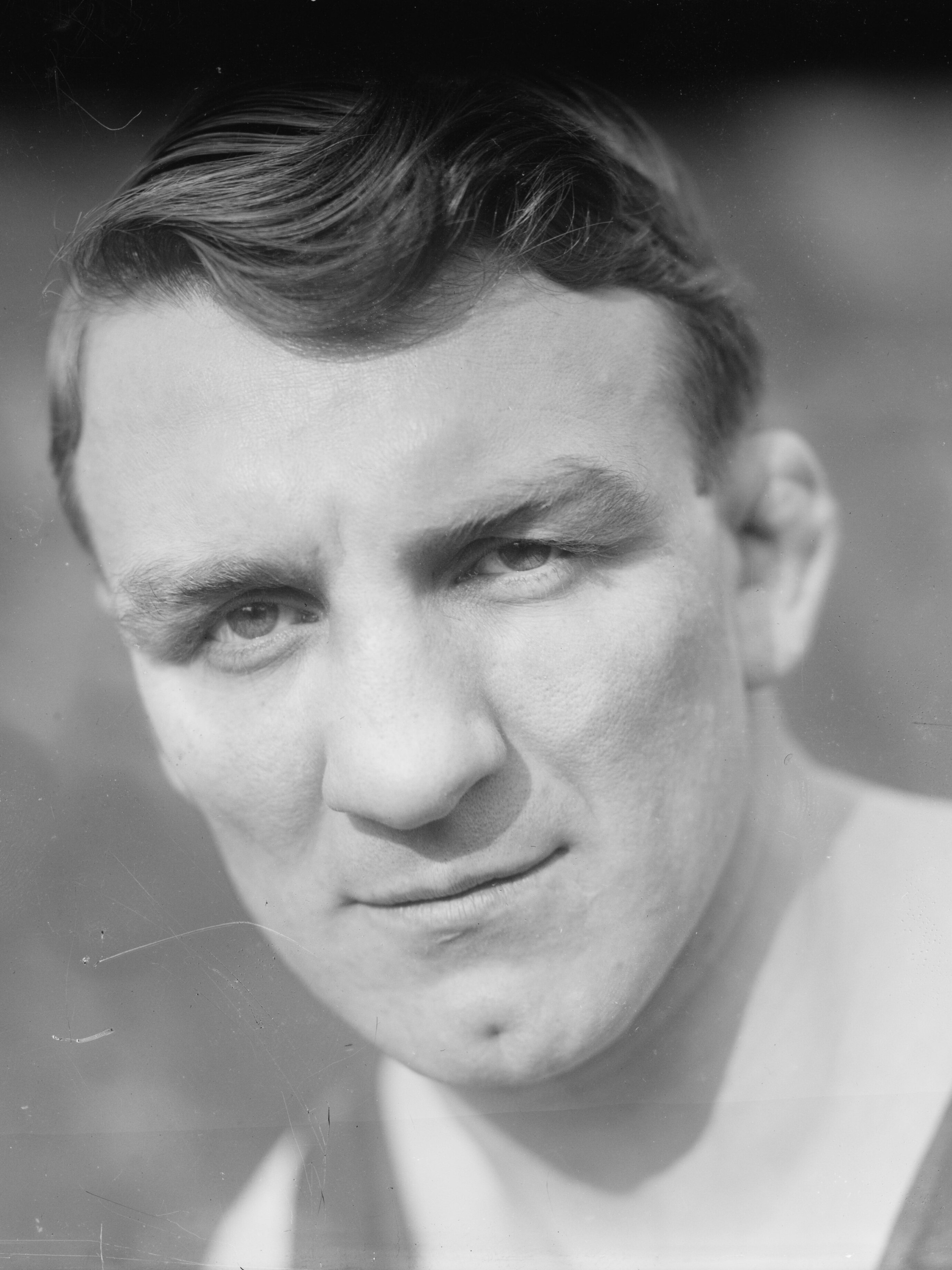

Personal information
- Nickname: The Welsh Wizard
- Born: Frederick Hall Thomas; 5 March 1886 Pontypridd, Wales
- Died: 29 July 1927 (aged 41) New York City, United States
- Weight: Lightweight

Boxing career
- Reach: 69 in (175.3 cm)

Boxing record
- Total fights: 168; with the inclusion of newspaper decisions
- Wins: 121
- Win by KO: 34
- Losses: 29
- Draws: 17
- No contests: 1

Freddie Welsh (born Frederick Hall Thomas; 5 March 1886 – 29 July 1927) was a Welsh World boxing champion. The lightweight boxer was born in Pontypridd, Wales, nicknamed the "Welsh Wizard". Brought up in a tough mining community, Welsh left a working-class background to make a name for himself in America. He turned professional as a boxer in Philadelphia in 1905, and spent the best part of his career fighting in the United States.

Welsh spent much of his career chasing the world championship title, held in turn by Battling Nelson, Ad Wolgast and Willie Ritchie, failing through a series of events to meet each until a successful encounter with Ritchie in July 1914, when he finally became world lightweight champion. Welsh held the title until 1917 when he lost to Benny Leonard, though he continued to fight sparingly until 1922. During his career, he fought in more than 160 professional bouts, suffering defeat on just 5 occasions.

A keen follower of Bernarr Macfadden's physical culture, Welsh believed in exercise and healthy living and was a non-smoker and a vegetarian. In the years following the end of his career, bad business choices cost him his fortune, and after numerous health problems he died in poverty in 1927.

== Boxing career ==
=== Early life and amateur career ===
Freddie Welsh was born in Pontypridd on 5 March 1886, to John Thomas and his wife Elizabeth Thomas (née Hall). In the late 19th century, Pontypridd was a growing coal mining town, which attracted not only those wishing to make a living in the mines, but also middle-class professionals who saw an opportunity to make a living in a thriving community. Welsh's father was one such commercial immigrant, setting up a business on Taff Street as an auctioneer. Welsh's parents moved into 17 Morgan Street in the town, where Welsh was born. He had two younger siblings, a brother, Arthur Stanley and a sister, Edith Kate. Unlike most boxers of the period, Welsh had a privileged upbringing, at the age of four he attended Mr Mclune's Grammar School in Pontypridd and was privately educated at Long Ashton College in Clifton, Bristol. A few months after Welsh was born, his mother persuaded her husband to buy the Bridge Inn Hotel on Berw Road, and the family moved there. Welsh's mother was the daughter of a hotelier from Merthyr, and the Bridge Inn was her responsibility, as John Thomas was often away from home. When Welsh was ten, his father died. His mother, faced with running the hotel alone, sent Kate and Stanley to an aunt in Merthyr, while Welsh was sent to his maternal grandfather in Radyr. After a year, suffering from homesickness, Welsh returned home to Pontypridd. His mother later remarried, to Richard Williams, an innkeeper from Aberdare.

When Welsh left school at the age of 14, he took up work as a boilerman (the 1901 census, when he was 15, has him recorded as an apprentice mechanical engineer) finding work with Llewellyn & Cubbitt of Pentre, Rhondda. At the age of 16 he and three friends decided to find a new life in Canada. They set sail from Liverpool to Vancouver arriving in January 1903, but although his companions were able to find work, Welsh struggled to hold down any steady jobs. It was in Canada that he took a serious interest in bodybuilding and became a firm advocate of Bernarr Macfadden's physical culture regime. After a year Welsh was again homesick and borrowed enough money to return to Britain, but with only $10 he was forced to travel as a worker on a cattle-boat.

With his newfound physical fitness he entered the boxing ring undertaking amateur fights in Scotland, far away from Wales to prevent his mother discovering his passion for fighting. After twelve months he raised the money needed to return to the America, travelling to New York on the Baltic on her maiden voyage on 29 June 1904.

Welsh failed to find steady work in the States, and although his mother thought he was earning a regular wage and living comfortably, Welsh was actually taking any casual work that was offered him. Initially he rode the rails to the Dakotas to labour in the farm fields, before heading to New York City working long hours as a dishwasher or banner bearer. When Welsh was mugged while sleeping at a cheap hotel, he was given a job as a porter by the sympathetic hotel manager.

But the next day it was cold and snowy, and I walked all day and couldn't get a job or a meal. So that night I was standing there at the lunch counter when my friends came in again. "Billy Elmer will give you five dollars to fight tonight," they said. I was too hungry to stand it any longer. Five dollars meant a thick steak and some browned potatoes and a piece of pie and a cup of real coffee. I stood there and thought with my mouth watering. And then I went upstairs and I won my fight.

— Welsh describing the moment he took his first paid fight in an interview taken 26 April 1913, with Herbart Corey in The New York Globe

His first job in New York was as a boxing instructor in one of Bernarr Macfadden institutes. He was allowed to sleep in the gym, was given all his meals, plus $1 salary a day. It was as an instructor he first met his future wife, Brahna Weinstein, a Jewish Russian girl who anglicised her name to Fanny Weston when her family moved to the East Side.

He then successfully applied to an advertisement for a "smart, active young man who can box" at a down town gym, Knipe's Institute. Welsh subsidised his work as a trainer, as a boxing instructor and training director at Brown's Gymnasium. When hard times hit the gym, he was put on half time subsidising his earnings as a snow shoveller in Harlem. Welsh then found work at a well-known New York gymnasium for $8 a day, the wage barely paid his meals but he took the job to learn the boxing profession.

Despite going days without eating, and having to sleep on the wrestling mats at the gym, he refused to turn professional, partially to preserve his amateur status and he also did not want his mother to discover he was earning a living as a boxer. When friends who knew him from his gym work, and seeing him struggle to pay for a decent meal, asked why he didn't take up the nightly paid 'private' fights, Welsh initially refused. Despite his misgivings, the next day Welsh took up the offer and knocked out Kid Allen in a third round bout. This was followed with wins over Johnny Mezier, Young Peterson and Jack Cameron. With his financial issues resolved and being able to pay for steady meals, at the age of 19, Welsh decided to turn professional.

=== Early professional career, 1905–1906 ===
Still with dreams of becoming a culture expert, he moved to Philadelphia to become an instructor at Herman's Institute, while Fanny stayed in New York to finish her studies. Before his first professional fight, Welsh decided to change his name, fearing he may fail and that his mother would find out he was boxing. He first chose Fred Cymry, Cymry meaning Welsh, but on writing to Fanny, she suggested that 'Welsh' would be less confusing. Welsh took Jack Clancy on as his American manager, and on 21 December 1905 he experienced his first professional bout. His first opponent was Young Williams, and the two novices fought at the Broadway Athletic Club of Philadelphia. Welsh won by knockout in the third round, and was booked to return to the club for his second fight in January. He went six rounds with Johnny Keely on 25 January, with a 'no-decision' verdict, the standard practice in Philadelphia for full-distance fights at the time, given to the fight. His next match saw him stop Eddie Fay in the sixth, and with this promising start to his career, the Broadway Athletic Club lined up a more challenging opponent, journeyman Tommy Feltz. The fight went all six rounds, and although Feltz was past his best, he was expected to win the bout; so the result, given to Welsh by the Philadelphia Item, was seen as an upset. From that fight, Welsh started to take more frequent matches, sometimes accepting two bouts a week to build up his experience and stamina. In March 1906, he faced four opponents, defeating Tommy Love and Kid Stinger (both 'no-decision', but given by the Philadelphia Item) and then a points win over Eddie Lenny, followed by a draw with Johnny Dohan. The Lenny result was the first of eight bouts to which the Philadelphia Item failed to give Welsh a victory, though seven of them were 'no-decision' verdicts on the night. The seven matches after Dohan were Billy Maharg, who took the fight decisively on points, then Frank Carsey, followed by three experienced fighters, Jimmy Devine, Tommy Love and Matty Baldwin; the last two opponents on this losing streak were Philadelphians Billy Willis and Tim Callahan.

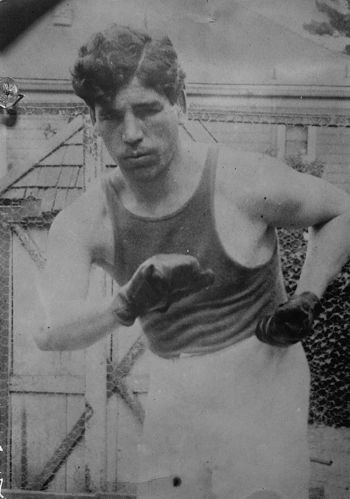
Young Erne, who faced Welsh twice, firstly in Philadelphia in 1906

On 12 May, two days after the Callahan encounter, he faced Jack Reardon, another 'no-decision' match, though on this occasion Welsh was given the bout by the press. This was followed by a win over Kid Gleason, and a second-round stoppage of Mike Loughlin. The 15 June saw a rematch with Chicago native Frank Carsey, which after the full six rounds it was again declared a 'no-decision', but with the press siding with Carsey. Carsey and Welsh would later become close friends over the years, with Carsey becoming his sparring partner, and was part of Welsh's corner team during his big fights.

Welsh finished June with a gruelling win over Billy Glover, before facing Young Erne, an intelligent boxer from Philadelphia. The match against Young Erne quickly turned into a slugging contest with both men forgetting their defensive strategies for an all-out attacking contest. The crowd were well entertained in a six-round bout, which the press gave to Welsh. The next contest was to be his first twenty-round match and his first professional fight outside Philadelphia, in Dayton, Ohio, against Australian lightweight champion Hock Keys. Welsh injured his favoured right hand in the sixth round, forcing him to box left-handed for the next eleven rounds, and won the match by technical knockout after downing Keys twice in the sixteenth round, and again in the seventeenth.

After the defeat of Hock Keys, Welsh took a month break, partly due to a failed show by Tim Callahan. He faced Jimmy Dunn on 31 August, in a six-round bout that went all the way, the press favouring Dunn. Welsh took another extended break, and when he returned to the ring, both he and Dunn agreed to another encounter, this time a twenty-round match at Dayton. The contest went the distance, with the referee declaring the match a draw, which enraged the crowd.

He fought twice more in America before the end of the year, both six-round results given to Welsh by the press: against Willie Moody on 23 November and then Kid Gleeson in December. Welsh now had a fine record behind him, but a few days after the Gleeson fight, he received news from Wales that his mother was seriously ill, and with Fanny still in New York, he returned to Britain on the Etruria.

=== First British fights, 1907 ===
When Welsh returned to Britain, he was still an unknown, even in boxing circles. Despite his mother's illness Welsh arranged boxing matches in Britain, his first was against Seaman Arthur Hayes, a six-round match held at the National Sporting Club (NSC) in London. Welsh took the contest on points and followed this up with another points victory at the NSC, this time a 15-round bout against Young Joseph. To this point, Welsh had never fought in his home country, and to introduce himself to a Welsh audience, a display was arranged at the Park Gymnastic Club in Pontypridd on 17 April 1907. No opponent of sufficient calibre was available to fight, so he took on three local boxers. All three men lasted no more than three rounds.

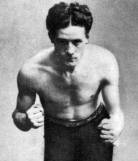
Jim Driscoll, friend and later rival of Welsh

On 21 May, Welsh took part in a fight against Johnny Owens of Aberaman, unofficial lightweight champion of Wales. The contest was for a purse of £50 and the Welsh lightweight title, though as a spectacle the match was a disappointment, with Welsh in complete control of the bout from the second round. After a two-month break, Welsh's next fight was a win over Sid Russell of Cheltenham on 18 July; and the next day appeared at an exhibition bout at Pontypridd, where he sparred with Jim Driscoll a fighter who would play a prominent part in Welsh's boxing career. After a win over Young Lilly in August, he followed this with a victory over former amateur featherweight champion, Dick Lee. A few days later at the St. Mary Hill Fair at Pencoed in Wales, Welsh and Driscoll fought in their first recorded match. Driscoll was working for the Frank Guess Boxing Booth at the fair, when Welsh accepted the barker's offer of £1 if he could last six rounds with Driscoll. In Welsh's previous fight Driscoll had been part of Welsh's corner, so it came as some surprise to Driscoll when his friend was over enthusiastic in the challenge, attacking him with kidney and rabbit punches. Driscoll never forgave Welsh for taking such liberties.

There was no secret about the fact that, although in his native town, south Wales sportsmen were longingly hoping that in White they had found one 'to burst the bubble that was Freddie Welsh.' Freddie had aped everything American... - in manner and in speech; in fact, in every way he had become truly Yankee.

— An observer from the September 1907 encounter with Joe White

After winning a rematch against Seaman Hayes on 7 September, Welsh was invited to a private fight arranged by local industrialists for a fee of £100 plus a large purse. Some individuals had felt that Welsh had embraced America too much, and had undertaken too many 'Yankee' mannerisms, forgetting his home country. The fight was arranged to test Welsh, and they chose Joe White, a Swiss-Canadian who had also learnt his boxing art in the United States, but was now living in Cardiff. The fight took place in a converted loft in front of a select crowd of about sixty, who were balloted to gain their tickets. The fight went to sixteen rounds before White, who had suffered since the eleventh, threw in the towel.

Welsh's final fight in Britain until 1910, took place in Pontypridd on 3 October, when he faced two opponents on the same night. He stopped both in five rounds, first beating Gunnar Hart, the welterweight champion of the Royal Navy; then Arthur Ellis. Welsh never fought competitively in Pontypridd again. On 4 October, Welsh left for America, catching the train to Liverpool before taking the Lusitania to New York.

An insight into Welsh's personality was recorded in a legal case he raised which was concluded after he had left for the States. Welsh took the case against one of the three boys he travelled to Canada with in 1902, claiming that he had given the defendant, David Davies, £8 for the cost of the trip. Davies denied having received the money, and knew nothing of the claim until meeting Welsh in Taff Street in June, who then threatened to 'knock him through a window if he didn't pay the money'. After testimonies from the other two emigrants who travelled with Davies and Welsh, the judge found in favour of Welsh.

=== Return to America and first international belt, 1907–1909 ===
On arrival in the United States, Welsh met Fanny in New York and the two of them travelled to Philadelphia. On 2 November 1907, Welsh faced Cyclone Johnny Thompson at the National Athletic Club in the city. The six-round encounter ended in a 'no-decision' given by the press to Welsh. A similar result was given in the contest against a poor Boxer Kelly, before he faced Willie Fitzgerald at Spring Garden Athletic Club; another six-round bout given as a draw. Welsh then experienced his first American fight outside Pennsylvania when a bout was arranged between him and Dave Deshler at the Winnisemmet Club in Chelsea, Massachusetts. The ten-round bout went the distance, with Welsh victorious by points decision, and he was congratulated by Theodore Roosevelt Jr. at the end of the match.

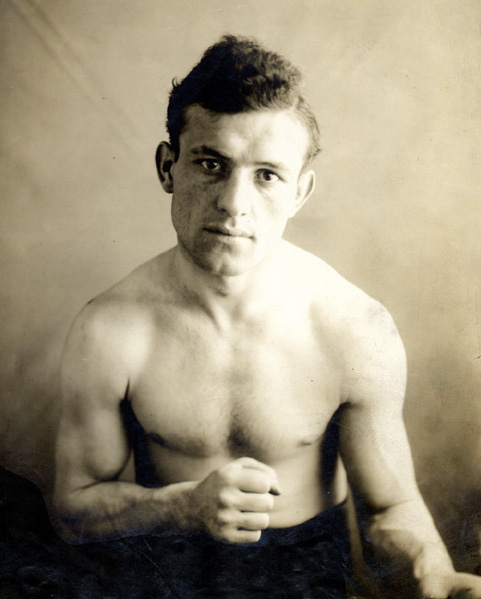
Packey McFarland fought Welsh three times, twice in 1908

Welsh went on to beat Eddie Carter in Philadelphia on Christmas Day 1907, Kid Locke on 2 January and then Maurice Sayers at the Milwaukee Boxing Club. He then faced local Milwaukee boxer Charley Neary in a ten-round match, the decision going to the referee Al Bright, who called the encounter a draw. This was followed by a fight against Chicago boxer Packey McFarland, regarded as one of the greatest lightweight boxers in history, which McFarland won on points. The contest caused controversy after Welsh was floored in the fourth round following what is believed to be a low shot. The referee failed to see the offending blow, and the match continued. When the points decision was announced there was jeering from the crowd, and accusations of favouritism were made, as referee Malachy Hogan was a Chicago man and had previously favoured Chicago fighters.

With fan frustration after the McFarland match, a rematch was arranged for 4 July, with Welsh facing just one opponent in the four and a half months between the bouts, Phil Brock. Welsh was meant to fight Dick Hyland, but blood poisoning to the Welshman's hand meant the Hyland fight did not take place. The Brock encounter, held at Vernon, California, was Welsh's first 25-round bout and ended in a terribly one-sided victory with a plucky Brock losing on points.

The rematch with McFarland was set for 4 July, Independence Day, to coincide with the world lightweight title fight between champion Joe Gans and Battling Nelson held in California. The Welsh-McFarland fight was gaining much press attention, and this increased after fight promoter and owner of the Jeffries Arena, Jim Jeffries, had offered Gans a $20,000 purse to face the winner of the bout in August. Betting was heavy for the match, and was to be refereed by Jeffries himself. Fought over 25 rounds, Welsh had the upper hand for the first nineteen, but after an announcement was made that Nelson had won in California, Welsh's game slipped with McFarland taking control. In the final two rounds Welsh took a heavy beating and was knocked down to the canvas in the last round. At the end of the encounter the decision from the referee was a draw. McFarland took the result badly and launched into a vicious tirade of abuse towards Jeffries, though Welsh too thought he had done enough to win in the first two-thirds of the fight and sent a cablegram to Wales stating such.

After the McFarland draw, for the first time the American press began questioning Welsh's credentials as a champion contender, mainly due to his inability to finish off his opponent due to a lack of punching power. Welsh was hurt by the remarks that he was a 'snowflake puncher', and used his next three fights to prove his critics wrong. Johnny Murphy went the full twenty-five rounds but suffered a terrible beating, Frank Carsey was knocked out in round four, lying unconscious for five minutes; while Harry Trendall was laid out in the sixth.

Although Welsh was chasing Nelson for a title shot, Nelson took an eight-month sabbatical after winning his rematch in September over Gans. Around this time, Welsh received a promise of a fight from fellow Brit Johnny Summers for the European title, but the major challenger in California was Abe Attell, the featherweight champion of the world since 1906. Attell had run out of opponents, so after much advertising of the match, the two men met on 25 November 1911. Although Attell's boxing weight was half a stone lighter than Welsh's on the night, both men weighed in at 128 lb (58 kg). Under stormy weather conditions, Welsh won by points in a fifteen-round match, with one newspaper reporting that although Attell did not lose his featherweight title, he did "lose the title that he has held for years, that being the cleverest man in the game".

Welsh followed up the Attell fight with a narrow victory over George Memsic in Los Angeles, before heading to New Orleans to take a points victory over Young Erne and then a knock-out win over Ray Bronson. Shortly after the Bronson fight, Welsh learned that Nelson had no intention of facing him, deciding to face three more opponents before retiring; none of these talks included Welsh. Welsh carried on fighting, with one final match in New Orleans against Young Donahue. It was an acrimonious affair before the bout started, and when Welsh rejected the referee before the match began, another referee was found, but was told to call a draw if no clear winner was apparent. When the fight reached its ten-round conclusion, the referee called a draw, much to Welsh's annoyance.

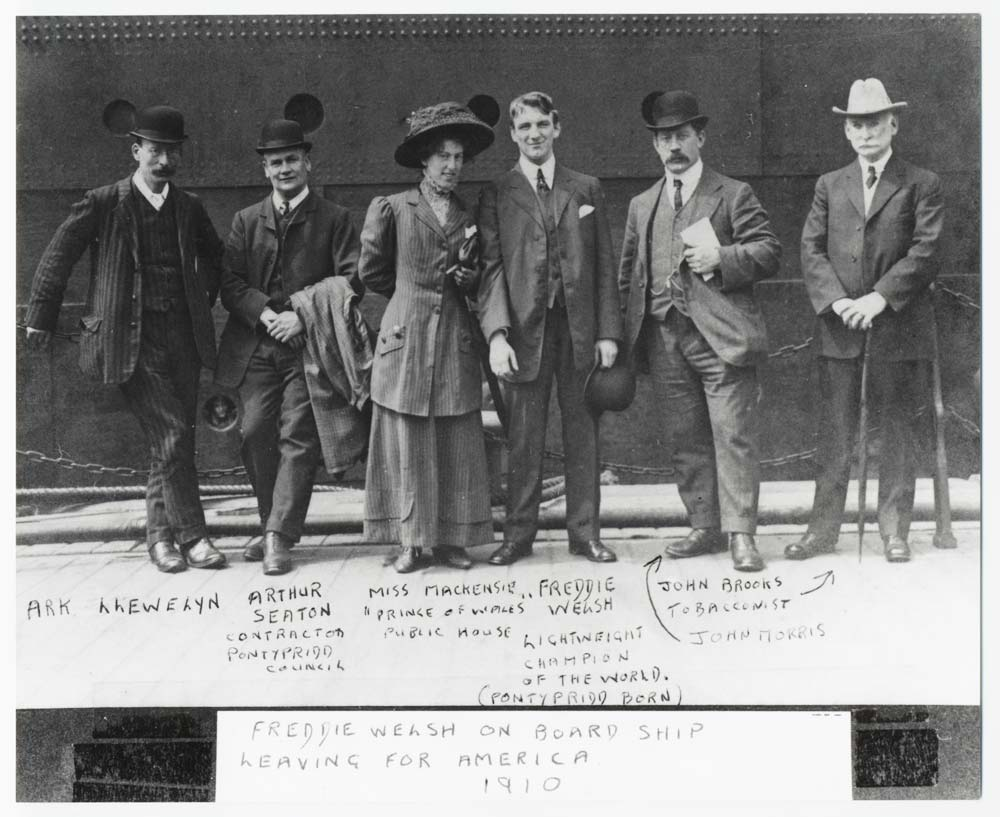
Freddie Welsh at docks, incorrectly labelled as 1910

Welsh and Fanny headed East to New York, and on 7 May he made his New York debut against Johnny Frayne. The match went the full ten rounds, with the press giving Welsh the decision with a lukewarm report, comparing him unfavourably against Jim Driscoll. Welsh finished off his tour of America with far more convincing displays over Jack Goodman and Phil Brock. With his sights now on the Lonsdale Belt, Welsh travelled back to Britain.

On his arrival at Cardiff on 19 June he was greeted by a throng of admirers; one of the first to greet him was Jim Driscoll. Cars had been arranged to take Welsh through Pontypridd, and he asked Driscoll to join him on the journey. Despite Pontypridd having a population of 32,000 at the time, reports were made that 80,000 people lined the streets to see their hero's arrival.

Welsh began his British return with an encounter with Young Joseph at the Pavilion in Mountain Ash, a 20-round match which only reached the eleventh after Young was disqualified for two low punches. Just over a month later, Welsh was back fighting in Mountain Ash, to face little known French lightweight Henri Piet. The press were unimpressed with the choice of opponent, but Piet gave a good account for himself before retiring in the twelfth. After Piet, Welsh faced Joe Fletcher from England; it was a terribly mismatched affair which resulted in negative press reports towards Welsh's choice of opponents. In truth there were very few fighters of a sufficient calibre to test Welsh in Britain, but on 8 November, Welsh got his chance to face Johnny Summers, for the British and European lightweight championship.

The Summers fight took part at the National Sporting Club in Covent Garden, with a purse of £2,200 and the Lonsdale Belt at stake. Welsh took control in the first round and never let Summers into the fight. One reporter counted 200 successful blows to Summers head during the match, and he was bleeding as early as the third round. During the fight, some members of the crowd jeered Welsh's use of the kidney punch, which although not outlawed at the time was seen as unsporting; he was also cautioned by the referee for the use of his head in the fifth. The fight went the distance, with Welsh winning on points; in taking the Lonsdale Belt he was the pride of Wales and America, but many in the boxing fraternity of England saw in Welsh a cynical, cold and cruel fighter.

=== McFarland, Driscoll and Wells, 1910–1911 ===
Welsh took a break away from boxing after winning the Lonsdale Belt, earning good money making theatrical appearances at music halls in London, but a chance meeting with Packy McFarland led to a match being arranged between them. Welsh warmed up for the bout with a win over Jack Daniels, before facing McFarland for the third time, now on British soil at Covent Garden. The match was billed as the "Light-weight Championship of the World", but that title was now held by Ad Wolgast who had beaten Battling Nelson in a shock win in February. McFarland started the fight well, and most reporters gave him the first nine rounds, after that Welsh took most of the rounds, though in the eyes of the British press he failed to claw back the advantage McFarland had opened up in the early rounds. Although the result after twenty rounds was a draw, the British newspapers reported that McFarland had been robbed of a victory.

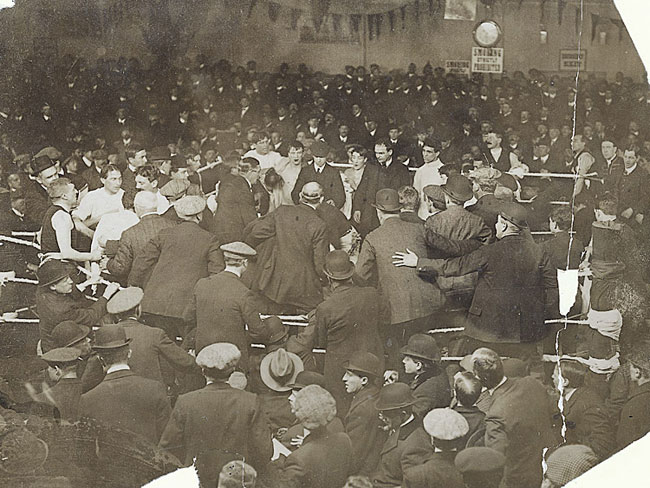
Chaotic scenes after the 1910 Welsh vs Driscoll fight

In the summer of 1910, Welsh was finding it difficult to find a fight. Wolgast was pricing himself out of the market, McFarland could not reach the weight and the National Sporting Centre could not find a credible contender to challenge for the Lonsdale Belt. Jim Driscoll, who had earlier won the flyweight Lonsdale Belt, was in a similar situation and a highly anticipated match was arranged between them. Two uninspiring fights were arranged before the Driscoll encounter in December, a sixth round win over middleweight Joe Heathcote and then a ninth round stoppage over Dick Bailey. A long build up to the game caused the relationship between Welsh and Driscoll to sour, and when they met to sign the contracts, an argument broke out between the two men over the choice of referee. Driscoll lost his temper with Welsh, became verbally abusive and stormed out of the meeting.

The fight took place on 20 December 1910 at the American Skating Ring in Cardiff, in front of a crowd of 10,000. Welsh started well, surprising the crowd with a straight back stance, out-jabbing Driscoll, but in the fifth he reverted to his normal crouched stance. Welsh's tactics changed and was now using his kidney punch on his opponent, amidst cries of "foul" from the crowd. He also tried to get in close to Driscoll, holding with one arm and delivering body blows with the other, which saw Driscoll adopt a similar tactic. By the eighth round Driscoll was coming into the match, and forced the fighting in the ninth. In the tenth round, Driscoll, becoming irritated at Welsh's clinches and illegal use of his shoulder, rushed Welsh and head butted him on the chin. It was an obvious foul, the referee, Arthur Frederick Bettinson, quickly entered the ring and disqualified Driscoll. The end of the fight was mired further when men from each of the boxers' corners began arguing before coming to blows, which saw the police entering the ring.

In early 1911, Welsh was about to set off for the United States when Matt Wells, a little-known British boxer who had recently turned professional, challenged him for his title. Welsh accepted, but was unprepared for Wells, who had been studying Welsh for the last eighteen months. On 27 February 1911 Welsh entered the ring at Covent Garden to little cheer, with the crowd supporting Wells the underdog. Wells' tactics were finely executed and he built up a healthy lead by attacking Welsh from the first round, he then spent the second half of the match defending his body and his lead. When the twenty rounds were up, Wells was given the decision and the championship title. Welsh departed for America on 11 March 1911, no longer a champion.

=== Reclaiming the British lightweight title 1911–1913 ===
Jones, I would not run the risk of breaking or dirtying my hands on your face. You can't get anything by this and it looks like kid work to me. I thought you were a grown up man. I can make $5,000 and win the lightweight title by licking Wolgast, but if I knocked you down I'd be arrested for hitting a fat man.

— Welsh's response to Tom 'Ten per cent' Jones' threat to fight him on a street in Venice, California

Welsh's time in Britain had damaged his credibility in America, so he set out to make amends. An easy victory over Pal Moore in March was followed by a trip to California to face Matty Baldwin in San Francisco. Welsh won the Baldwin fight on points in a performance that was considered an excellent display of boxing. On 4 August 1911, after weeks of negotiation, it was announced that Wolgast would face Welsh on 30 November, Welsh's first attempt at the world title. The buildup was intense and both camps attempted to use the media to their advantage. Just days before the match, with tickets in high demand, the man named in the fight articles as the referee, Eddie Smith, died. This led to arguments between Welsh and Tom 'Ten per cent' Jones, Wolgast's manager, as both tried to get the most favourable replacement referee. When Jones and Welsh met each other by chance on Windward Avenue in Venice, California, the men came to a heated argument with Jones threatening that he would 'knock his [Welsh] block off'. A few days later, realising that he was in the weaker position as the challenger, Welsh accepted Jones' choice of referee, Jack Welch. On the eve of the big encounter, news reached Welsh that Wolgast had been taken to hospital with acute appendicitis and would be unable to fight for three months. Walgast's last-minute replacement Willie Ritchie took Welsh the full twenty rounds, and although he failed to beat the Welshman, the fight had many fans contemplating how Welsh would have fared against the champion.

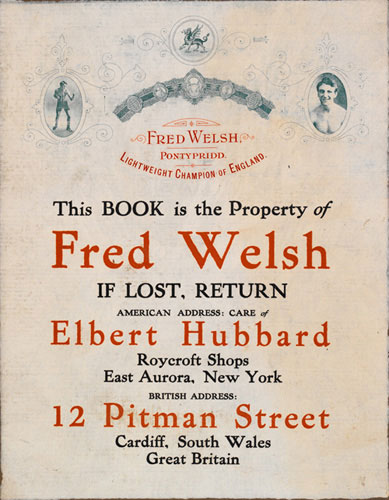
Welsh's personal journal, his US return address given as friend Elbert Hubbard

In January 1912, Welsh dislocated his neck in a bout of wrestling. He was now unable to box and running low on money after living beyond his means. He left San Francisco in March, travelling to Canada where he took in an exhibition bout with Jack O'Brien, before heading to Chicago where he and Fanny stayed for two months. Welsh then decided to head to New York as to take in some six-round matches to earn some money. On the way through Buffalo he fought Jimmy Duffy, although about half a stone overweight, Welsh was given the bout by the press, and was at least making money again. While in Buffalo, Welsh visited his friend Elbert Hubbard and after long philosophical discussions, he returned to boxing with a new purpose, intent on regaining his British title. He fought three more times in America before he returned to Britain, two draws against Grover Hayes and a press decision over Phil Knight.

In September 1912, Welsh travelled back to Britain on the Mauritania. A rematch was planned with Wells for 11 November, and Welsh warmed up with a points win over Jack Langdon in Liverpool. Almost three weeks later he faced Wells at Covent Garden for a second time, but now as challenger. Wells took the first four rounds, but in the sixth round, Welsh landed a combination of punishing blows which slowed the champion down. By the tenth round the match was level, and as the match progressed Welsh took charge. At the end of the 20 round bout Welsh was declared European and British champion.

Just before his next fight, news came from America that Willie Ritchie had taken the world title from Wolgast, strengthening Welsh's case for a championship shot. Before he could return a British Empire title fight had been arranged against Australian Hughie Mehegan. The encounter went the full 20 rounds, and although Welsh won on points he took a severe beating, complaining he found it difficult to sleep from the pain three or four days after the fight.

In early January 1913, Welsh's mother, who had been ill for some time, died. He gave up his immediate plans to chase Willie Ritchie and stayed in Wales for a while to be near his family. He fought four more fights in Britain, beginning with a home contest in Aberdare against Frenchman Paul Brevieres, who was stopped in the third. Then he took a points win over Young Nipper, a successful defence of his European title against Raymond Vittet, finishing with a points win over Eddie Beattie. The three final fights were conducted within seven days, and Welsh almost paid the price for such a challenging schedule when Beattie knocked him down for nine seconds in the ninth.

=== World title bid 1913–1914 ===
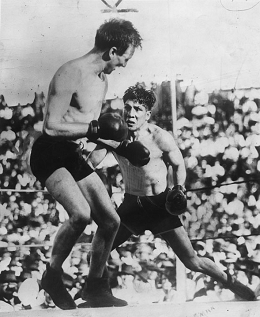
Welsh vs Rivers, St Patricks Day 1914 in Vernon, California

When Welsh returned to America he was intent on fighting Ritchie, having failed to meet both Nelson and Wolgast. He employed the services of Harry Pollok, one of New York's most flamboyant sports impresarios. When Welsh and Fanny arrived in New York on 29 March 1913, Pollok was there orchestrating the reporters and photographers. Even with Pollack's help Ritchie was difficult to commit. Champions tended to stick to the East Coast, fighting in six round contests where the 'no-decision' contests meant the only way the title could be lost would be through a knockout. When Welsh arrived in New York, Billy Dolan, Ritchie's manager, announced that the champion would not be fighting for four months as he was touring Europe to fulfil theatrical commitments.

In preparation of a possible title bid on Ritchie's return, Welsh started his build up on 28 April by going the distance with Al Ketchell in Bridgeport. He then headed north to Canada to take the press decisions over Jack Redmond on 16 May and Kid Scaler on 24 May. These fights were followed by bouts against Billy Farrell in Moose Jaw, Ray Campbell and Young Jack O'Brien in Vancouver and then Martin Murphy in Fernie, British Columbia. In early July Welsh broke off his Canadian tour to watch Ritchie's return to the ring. It was an unimpressive display over 'Mexican' Joe Rivers, saved only by a knockout in the eleventh. During this period, to insure his name stayed in the papers, Welsh revealed that he and Fanny Weston had actually been married since 1905, a secret kept from all but the closest family members. This was followed by a stunt to break the Canadian land speed record over a mile. Welsh sat in with 'Speed King' Bob Burman when he broke the record in 50.8 seconds in his Blitzen Benz.

Eventually a fight was arranged between Welsh and Ritchie to be fought in Vancouver on 4 September 1913, but when Welsh turned on his ankle in training the date was forced back to the 20th. Worse was to follow when the evening before the fight Ritchie left Vancouver, later citing unhappiness over the filming rights of the fight. Around the same time, a gold belt awarded to Welsh after he won the Commonwealth encounter with Mehegan, was stolen while on display at a tea room near his training quarters. The belt was recovered when an Australian, named Henry Beckett, was caught trying to smuggle it out of the country.

Welsh responded to his bad luck by throwing himself back into competitive fighting. With three months of the year left, he arranged five fights. The first two contests, in Montana, against Fighting Dick Hyland and Leo Kossick were won on points decisions. These was followed with a match against Milburn Saylor who was disqualified in the ninth for a low blow. He faced Phil Bloom in New York, the press decision favouring Welsh, before he returned to Canada for a knockout win over Canadian Champion Arthur Ellis. Back in the United States, Welsh, although struggling with his weight was able to best Johnny Dundee in New Orleans, followed by a points victory over Frank Whitney in Atlanta. Welsh continued his journey east, stopping at Philadelphia for a match against Sam Robideau. This would be his third win in three different cities in just ten days. Five days later on 15 January 1914 in Kansas City he faced Mickey Sheridan of Chicago, who underwent "thirty minutes of torture and considerable humiliation" in an easy points decision for Welsh. He faced two more opponents in January, Earl Fisher in Cincinnati on the 26th followed by Leo Kelly in Saint Louis on the 29th, both were press decisions for Welsh. With his weight now coming down and his bank account swelled, Welsh and Pollok refocused on Ritchie. The American sportswriters were calling Welsh a 'has-been', so the two men devised a new strategy, if they could not get Ritchie to agree to a bout, they would beat as many of Ritchie's credible contenders until he could no longer ignore Welsh.

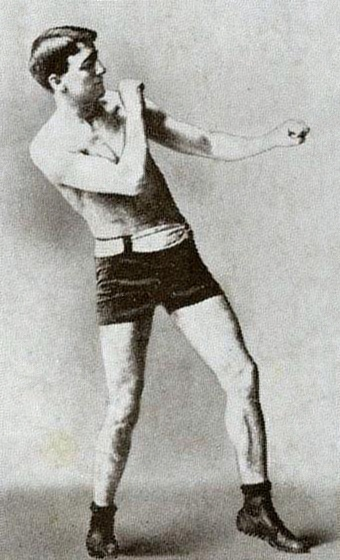
Welsh in boxing pose

The first target on his list was Mexican Joe Rivers, who had already had two failed attempts at the lightweight title. On his build-up to the match, Welsh suffered his first defeat since 1911, when Jimmy Duffy took the press decision over eight rounds in Saint Louis. Undeterred he continued his preparation for the contest with Rivers on 17 March in Vernon. Rivers started as favourite, but his inexperience showed and Welsh dominated the entire fight winning on points. After the fight, at a celebratory dinner, Welsh was shown a newspaper reporting King George V's enthusiasm for boxing. Welsh wrote to His Majesty thanking him for his support, the next day he received a royal response by telegram. Nearly every major newspaper in the United States and the United Kingdom printed the correspondence in full, giving Welsh much needed column space.

In the spring of 1914, Welsh contacted Ritchie and asked him if he would face him in England, providing he got a satisfactory guarantee of money. Ritchie agreed that he would fight for the right money. Welsh cabled the Olympia Theatre, London, and began booking advertising space. When Ritchie finally stated that he wanted $50,000, win lose or draw, Welsh said the price "would make a horse laugh", and was double what he was expecting. Despite this huge fee, England was desperate for a world champion and $40,000 was raised on the stipulation that Ritchie fought no other bouts in the meantime. Ritchie accepted the $40,000 but stated a fight was already planned and he would fight who he liked. The London syndicate relented to his demands. Before Ritchie's arranged fight with Charley White, Welsh took in two more encounters, beating Leach Cross on points and then Joe Mandot on press decision. All attention then switched to the White-Ritchie fight in Milwaukee. In almost the first punch that White connected with, Ritchie was in trouble. Staggered, Ritchie was laid open to a battering, but stayed on his feet until the end of the fight. White was declared winner, but as he had failed to stop Ritchie before the end of the match, he kept his world title. Pollok and Welsh then took a major gamble. They sent a telegram to Ritchie with the message, 'Promoters have called off match with you. Want us to meet White.', a bluff to force the Champion's hand. The following day Ritchie accepted a fee for $25,000 and $1,500 expenses to meet Welsh in London. The White fight had cost Ritchie almost $15,000.

Welsh and Pollok set off for Britain on the Imperator, and on his arrival on 12 June, he told reporters that he had received news from Fanny of the birth of his first child, Elizabeth. The fight took place on 7 July, and from the first round Welsh took control. It wasn't until the sixth when Ritchie caught Welsh on the jaw that he took a round. Welsh played defensive, but landed with jabbing blows to the head, while Ritchie kept looking for the massive knockout punch that would win the match. In the seventeenth round Ritchie was forced to up his game to find a winning punch, but failed to make significant contact before the end of the bout. Welsh was declared winner and lightweight boxing champion of the world, with the consensus around the ring that Welsh took ten rounds, Ritchie five and five were even. After the fight the new champion retired to The Waldorf Hilton, London, to see his daughter for the first time.

=== Championship years and World War I ===
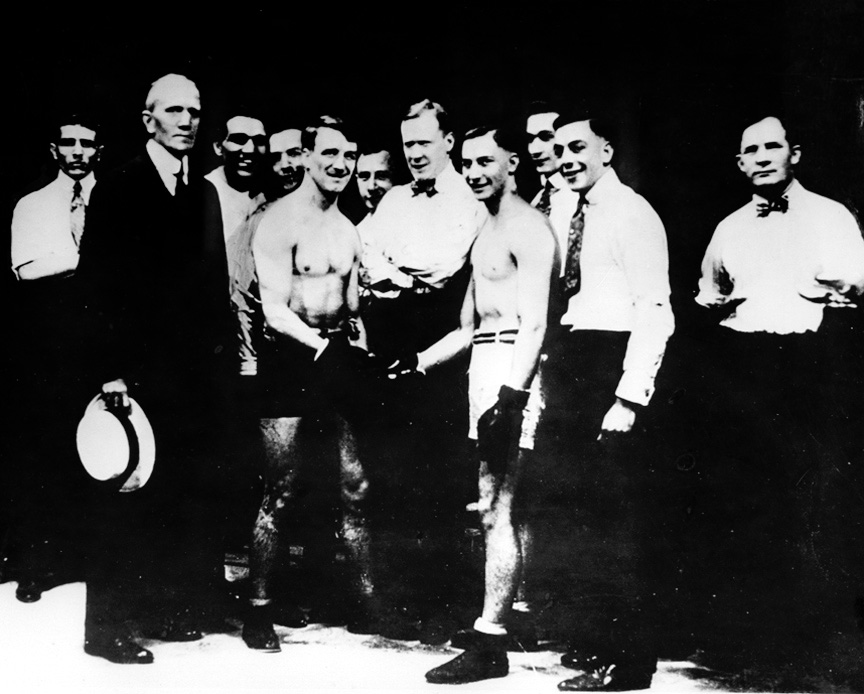
Welsh vs Leonard 1917

Just 25 days after becoming lightweight champion, Germany declared war on Russia, and the Great War began. His expected payout touring theatres was curtailed and he lost more than $50,000 in music hall engagements alone. Thanks to a manager of the White Star Line, he, Fanny and Elizabeth obtained first class passage to America on the Olympic. In some sections of the sporting press he was accused of cowardice for not joining the British Army. Welsh countered that he undertook numerous engagements to rally support for troops and stated "I can do far more for my country out of the trenches than in them."

In 1914 only two U.S. states allowed twenty round championship bouts to a verdict, Colorado and Louisiana, and no promoters in either state were offering large enough purses to risk losing the championship title for. To earn as much money as he could from being the champion, Welsh fought in as many ten round 'no verdict' matches as he could. As long as he was on his feet at the end of the ten rounds, he could not lose his title. Still, Welsh wanted to show he was not going to choose soft opposition and began a series of bouts against serious contenders. His first defence was against Matty Baldwin on 27 October in Boston, a match he won on points. This was followed six days later by a contest against Al Wolgast, the former champion who had avoided Welsh when he had the title to lose. The fight was a near sell out at Madison Square Garden in New York, with the crowd firmly behind Wolgast. Although the first few rounds were fairly even between the two fighters, at the end of the fifth round Wolgast blocked an uppercut with his right arm. The blow broke his ulna three inches (76 mm) above the wrist, forcing Wolgast to box on with just his left hand. Wolgast kept on fighting but could not continue after the eighth.

A week later Welsh faced Charley White, the man most sports-writers believed was the natural contender for the lightweight title. The ten round bout, held in Milwaukee, was a one-sided affair with Welsh landing four times as many punches as White. Despite White having the stronger punch, it was not until the tenth that he managed to draw blood, and many writers failed to give him even one round.

Welsh was expected to retire in 1915, with Harry Pollok stating that he planned to fight on four more occasions before leaving the sport. However, he continued fighting and retained the title until May 1917, when he was knocked out at the Manhattan Athletic Club by Benny Leonard, the first time in his career that he had been stopped. Leonard was deemed to have controlled the fight. After being floored in the ninth round, Welsh had risen back to his feet and absorbed even more blows before the referee called a halt to the bout.

== Later life ==
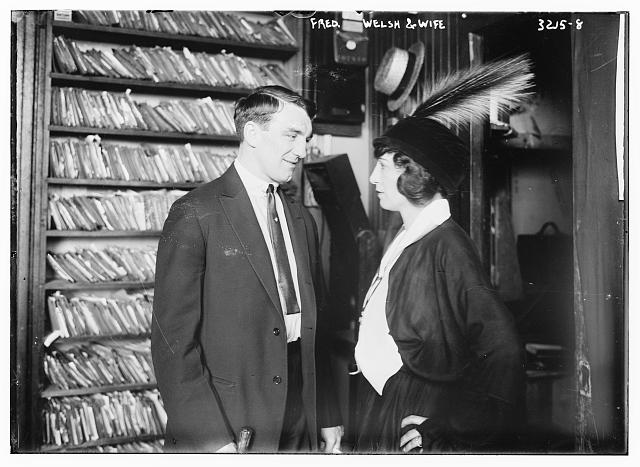
Welsh with his wife, Fanny

Welsh retired from boxing after a defeat by Archie Walker in 1922, but retired as a wealthy man. Before he lost to Leonard in 1917, Welsh bought a farm on Long Hill in Chatham Township, New Jersey. The farm was set in 162 acres (0.66 km^{2}) and Welsh spent thousands of dollars on improvements, installing a gymnasium, a state of the art kitchen, golf course, tennis courts and a swimming pool. His idea was to turn it into a health spa, and on 11 August 1917 a host of celebrities and dignitaries were invited to its opening. One of the guests, Bat Masterson, described Long Hill as a 'palatial home sitting high upon a hill, like an acropolis'.

Welsh found Long Hill a poor distraction and thought of joining the British forces, but was persuaded out of the idea by Fanny. Instead he joined the United States Army, serving as a lieutenant and was consigned to the Walter Reed Hospital where he helped rehabilitate disabled veterans.

In 1918 Welsh was struggling with Long Hill and decided he wanted rid of it. Welsh had spent $150,000 on Long Hill, his entire life's earnings, and he placed it on the market for $20,000 cash as his business was close to collapse. He was still unable to find a buyer. Welsh's dream was to earn and run a health farm, held since his first days in America; now with his dream in tatters his life began to disintegrate. On 11 October 1919, Welsh was the only diner in a restaurant on 50th and Broadway, when by coincidence Harry Pollok walked in. The men became violent, and a fight ensued which ended with Pollok being rushed to the Polyclinic Hospital with half his right ear in an ice bucket. Pollok swore out a warrant against Welsh who was arrested upon complaint that he had bitten his former manager's ear in half. Welsh denied the charges and after Pollok failed to appear to press the charge for a third time, the case was dismissed.

In 1920 he was discharged from his duties at Walter Reed Hospital having reached the rank of captain. He returned to Long Hill, and with his money dwindling made the decision to return to the ring. After six months of preparation he faced 'Kid' Green on 28 December 1920. Despite the three-and-a-half-year absence from the ring, Welsh was in good shape and took only four rounds to beat Green; though he had switched his trademark defensive boxing to a heavier brawling style. Welsh then fought twice in May 1921, against Willie Jackson and Kid Murphy, both wins; but the most notable event regarding the bouts was the appearance of heavyweight champion Jack Dempsey, who was spending time relaxing at Welsh's health farm. After two more fights in 1921, both in Canada, Welsh returned to New York to face Archie Walker in April 1922. The fight was a sporting disaster for Welsh, losing seven of the ten rounds, and by the tenth he was being chased around the ring as he covered himself up. It was a pitiful display and Welsh never stepped into a professional ring again.

By 1923, during Prohibition, Long Hill was attracting more guests for its supply of home-brewed ciders and beers than its sporting facilities. While in 1924, through their mutual acquaintance of Ring Lardner, F. Scott Fitzgerald turned up at the farm and sparred three rounds with Welsh. In 1924, Welsh was back in court, after he was involved in a car collision caused by him driving his vehicle on the wrong side of the road. Welsh began looking for other ventures to take him away from the health farm, and in 1925 he rejoined the US Army, becoming a boxing instructor at the Plattsburg Barracks in upstate New York. While in the forces he placed an advertisement for a manager to run Long Hill, which was accepted by neighbour and friend, Sidky Bey, and his wife Hranoush, known as Madame Bey. With strict curfew hours and a no-alcohol policy, Madame Bey made the farm a success, and Long Hill became an important training venue for New York boxers. But her tenure at the farm ended acrimoniously, over an argument with boxer Battling Siki, who Welsh believed to be a bad influence. After discussing the matter with other boxers, Madame Bey left Long Hill and set up her own rival venue. With Welsh in the Army and Madame Bey gone, the farm fell into disrepair. Bey later recalled Welsh fondly, stating that he was a man who enjoyed having a good time, but was a terrible businessman.

In 1927, with Welsh unable to raise the capital to pay the mortgage on his Long Hill estate, the farm was sold to satisfy a mortgage of $30,000 even though it was valued at $150,000. With Long Hill lost, Fanny and Welsh separated, Fanny taking a job as a live-in housekeeper at the St Paul's Hotel on 60th Street, New York, a venue where she and Welsh once lived in a suite of apartments. Soon after, Welsh's health began to deteriorate and he began complaining of severe chest pains. His doctor reported that Welsh was depressed and was drinking too much. On 17 July 1927 Welsh appeared at the West Side Court in New York City, sporting a black-eye suffered in a street brawl. He faced a charge of disorderly conduct, after he came off worse in a drunken encounter with Edward Delaney of New York. The patrolman who saved Welsh from a serious beating assured the magistrate that it was a friendly fight and the charges were dismissed against both men.

On 28 July 1927 a maid at Hotel Sidney, discovered Welsh laid face downward in his pyjamas and bathrobe. He had died in the night. A doctor was called who opined that Welsh had died of a heart attack. On 13 October 1927, Welsh's old health farm was destroyed in a fire.

== Legacy ==
Freddie Welsh was inducted into the 'Ring Boxing Hall of Fame' in 1960, the Welsh Sports Hall of Fame in 1994 and the 'International Boxing Hall of Fame' in 1997.

In 2008, Welsh was celebrated by Rhondda Cynon Taf council when it was decided to raise a blue plaque at his former boxing club to commemorate his life. The plaque was unveiled by Welsh boxer Dai Dower the following year.

=== Record ===
During the time Welsh boxed, scoring resulted in a large number of no-decision fights. However, newspapers commonly reported a winner in the case of no-decision bouts. With that adjustment, Welsh's final record would be 110–25–15 with 32 KOs and 16 no-decisions.

== Fighting style ==
During his career Welsh was often reported in the British press as having learned his boxing trade in America, and therefore he had an ungentlemanly style of boxing, especially when compared to the darling of the National Sporting Club, 'peerless' Jim Driscoll. Welsh had a history of boxing in his family, with his paternal grandfather being a mountain fighter.

Although Welsh is often criticised throughout his career as being unable to knock out his opponents, his style centred on his footwork and ability to avoid punishment. He was calm, elusive and able to frustrate those who faced him, especially heavy hitters. Welsh would often finish long fights without injury, while his opponents suffered heavy damage, and was described as "essentially a long-distance fighter".

== Vegetarianism ==
Welsh, when talking to the press, always stated that he was a vegetarian. This was always received with a mixture of interest and jest from his opponent and the journalists. Welsh was a vegetarian for its health values, inspired by the writings of Bernarr Macfadden, and showed no interest in animal welfare. When Welsh beat Phil Brock, he received a telegram from Macfadden stating 'Mr. Welsh - Dear Sir: Hope you will go through the whole bunch of meat eaters'.

Although he preached the benefits of vegetarianism, he was not averse to eating meat if required. In an interview Welsh once stated, "I don't believe in a variety of cooked dishes. I eat as much raw food as possible, and this second meal consists of all sorts of vegetables, and for the main dish I have a macaroni and cheese, followed by fruit and nuts and a little rice or tapioca pudding. I find plenty of vegetable and fruits to choose from without touching meat at all. I am not a faddist, and, I eat meat when I cannot get anything else."

In his later life his adherence to vegetarianism slipped, and his difficulty in maintaining his weight after 1913 was credited to him switching diets. Welsh was known to slip away after training to secluded roadhouses where he would eat his favourite meal Chicken Maryland.

== Selected publications ==
- Training the Body and Brain to Win: What and How to Eat (1915)

== Professional boxing record ==
All information in this section is derived from BoxRec, unless otherwise stated.

=== Official Record ===
168 fights	74 wins	5 losses
By knockout	34	1
By decision	36	4
By disqualification	4	0
Draws	7	
No contests	1	
Newspaper decisions/draws	81	

All newspaper decisions are officially regarded as “no decision” bouts and are not counted to the win/loss/draw column.

No.	Result	Record	Opponent	Type	Round	Date	Age	Location	Notes
168	Loss	74–5–7 (82)	Archie Walker	PTS	10	Apr 15, 1922	36 years, 41 days	Clermont Avenue Rink, New York City, New York, U.S.	
167	Draw	74–4–7 (82)	Clonie Tait	PTS	10	Aug 22, 1921	35 years, 170 days	Board of Trade Building, Winnipeg, Manitoba, Canada	For vacant Commonwealth lightweight title
166	Win	74–4–6 (82)	Bert Forbes	PTS	10	Aug 17, 1921	35 years, 165 days	Victoria Pavilion, Calgary, Alberta, Canada	
165	Win	73–4–6 (82)	Tommy Kid Murphy	TKO	2 (10)	May 4, 1921	35 years, 60 days	Morristown, New Jersey, U.S.	
164	Win	72–4–6 (82)	Willie Jackson	KO	8 (10)	May 3, 1921	35 years, 59 days	Summit, New Jersey, U.S.	
163	Win	71–4–6 (82)	Willie Green	TKO	4 (12)	Dec 28, 1920	34 years, 298 days	Newark, New Jersey, U.S.	
162	Loss	70–4–6 (82)	Benny Leonard	TKO	9 (10)	May 28, 1917	31 years, 84 days	Manhattan Casino, New York City, New York, U.S.	Lost world lightweight title
161	Loss	70–3–6 (82)	Johnny Kilbane	NWS	10	May 1, 1917	31 years, 57 days	Manhattan Casino, New York City, New York, U.S.	
160	Loss	70–3–6 (81)	Chick Simler	NWS	10	Apr 24, 1917	31 years, 50 days	Town Hall, Scranton, Pennsylvania, U.S.	
159	Loss	70–3–6 (80)	Rocky Kansas	NWS	10	Apr 20, 1917	31 years, 46 days	Broadway Auditorium, Buffalo, New York, U.S.	
158	Win	70–3–6 (79)	Battling Nelson	NWS	12	Apr 17, 1917	31 years, 43 days	Coliseum, Saint Louis, Missouri, U.S.	World lightweight title at stake; (via KO only)
157	Loss	70–3–6 (78)	Richie Mitchell	NWS	6	Jan 16, 1917	30 years, 317 days	Auditorium, Milwaukee, Wisconsin, U.S.	
156	Loss	70–3–6 (77)	Eddie Wallace	NWS	6	Nov 24, 1916	30 years, 264 days	Sohmer Park, Montreal, Quebec, Canada	
155	Loss	70–3–6 (76)	Buck Fleming	NWS	6	Nov 20, 1916	30 years, 260 days	Olympia A.C., Philadelphia, Pennsylvania, U.S.	
154	Win	70–3–6 (75)	Frankie Maguire	NWS	6	Nov 3, 1916	30 years, 243 days	Mishler Theatre, Altoona, Pennsylvania, U.S.	
153	Win	70–3–6 (74)	Ben Allen	PTS	10	Oct 28, 1916	30 years, 237 days	Quebec City, Quebec, Canada	
152	Win	69–3–6 (74)	Mike Ward	TKO	4 (?)	Oct 26, 1916	30 years, 235 days	Ottawa, Ontario, Canada	
151	Win	68–3–6 (74)	Bobby Wilson	TKO	7 (10)	Oct 25, 1916	30 years, 234 days	Sohmer Park, Montreal, Quebec, Canada	
150	Draw	67–3–6 (74)	Kid Scaler	NWS	6	Sep 25, 1916	30 years, 204 days	Victoria Pavilion, Calgary, Alberta, Canada	
149	Win	67–3–6 (73)	Harry Anderson	PTS	4	Sep 22, 1916	30 years, 201 days	Arena, Seattle, Washington, U.S.	Retained world lightweight title
148	Win	66–3–6 (73)	Charley White	PTS	20	Sep 4, 1916	30 years, 183 days	Ramona A.C. Arena, Colorado Springs, Colorado, U.S.	Retained world lightweight title
147	Win	65–3–6 (73)	Benny Leonard	NWS	10	Jul 28, 1916	30 years, 145 days	Washington Park A.C., New York City, New York, U.S.	
146	Win	65–3–6 (72)	Ad Wolgast	DQ	11 (15)	Jul 4, 1916	30 years, 121 days	Stockyards Stadium, Denver, Colorado, U.S.	Retained world lightweight title
145	Win	64–3–6 (72)	Tommy Lowe	PTS	10	Jun 8, 1916	30 years, 95 days	Capitol City A.C., Ardmore, Maryland, U.S.	
144	Draw	63–3–6 (72)	Frankie Maguire	NWS	6	May 3, 1916	30 years, 59 days	Chestnut Street Auditorium, Harrisburg, Pennsylvania, U.S.	
143	Loss	63–3–6 (71)	Ever Hammer	NWS	10	Apr 24, 1916	30 years, 50 days	Auditorium, Milwaukee, Wisconsin, U.S.	
142	Draw	63–3–6 (70)	Richie Mitchell	NWS	10	Apr 7, 1916	30 years, 33 days	Auditorium, Milwaukee, Wisconsin, U.S.	
141	Loss	63–3–6 (69)	Benny Leonard	NWS	10	Mar 31, 1916	30 years, 26 days	Madison Square Garden, New York City, New York, U.S.	World lightweight title at stake; (via KO only)
140	Win	63–3–6 (68)	Frank Ray Whitney	TKO	6 (?)	Mar 24, 1916	30 years, 19 days	Harlem S.C., Harlem, New York City, New York, U.S.	
139	Win	62–3–6 (68)	Phil Bloom	NWS	10	Mar 21, 1916	30 years, 16 days	Broadway Arena, New York City, New York, U.S.	
138	Win	62–3–6 (67)	Ad Wolgast	NWS	10	Mar 6, 1916	30 years, 1 day	Arcadia Rink, Milwaukee, Wisconsin, U.S.	
137	Loss	62–3–6 (66)	Johnny Griffiths	NWS	12	Jan 25, 1916	29 years, 326 days	Akron, Ohio, U.S.	
136	Loss	62–3–6 (65)	Eddie McAndrews	NWS	6	Jan 17, 1916	29 years, 318 days	Olympia A.C., Philadelphia, Pennsylvania, U.S.	
135	Win	62–3–6 (64)	Frank Ray Whitney	NWS	10	Jan 1, 1916	29 years, 302 days	Casino Skating Rink, Atlanta, Georgia, U.S.	
134	Loss	62–3–6 (63)	Jimmy Murphy	NWS	6	Dec 13, 1915	29 years, 283 days	Olympia A.C., Philadelphia, Pennsylvania, U.S.	
133	Draw	62–3–6 (62)	Benny Palmer	NWS	8	Dec 9, 1915	29 years, 279 days	Memphis, Tennessee, U.S.	
132	Win	62–3–6 (61)	Johnny O'Leary	NWS	12	Nov 15, 1915	29 years, 255 days	Amphitheatre Rink, Winnipeg, Manitoba, Canada	World lightweight title at stake; (via KO only)
131	Loss	62–3–6 (60)	Charley White	NWS	10	Jul 3, 1915	29 years, 120 days	Brighton Beach A.C., New York City, New York, U.S.	
130	Win	62–3–6 (59)	Johnny Lustig	NWS	10	Jun 18, 1915	29 years, 105 days	Ebbets Field, New York City, New York, U.S.	
129	Win	62–3–6 (58)	Frankie Fleming	NWS	10	May 24, 1915	29 years, 80 days	Sohmer Park, Montreal, Quebec, Canada	World lightweight title at stake; (via KO only)
128	Win	62–3–6 (57)	Red Watson	NWS	10	Apr 20, 1915	29 years, 46 days	Hudson, Wisconsin, U.S.	
127	Win	62–3–6 (56)	Billy Wagner	NWS	10	Apr 9, 1915	29 years, 35 days	Coliseum, Toledo, Ohio, U.S.	World lightweight title at stake; (via KO only)
126	Draw	62–3–6 (55)	Johnny Lustig	NWS	10	Mar 27, 1915	29 years, 22 days	Montreal, Quebec, Canada	
125	Win	62–3–6 (54)	Patsy Drouillard	NWS	10	Mar 24, 1915	29 years, 19 days	Windsor A.C., Windsor, Ontario, Canada	
124	Win	62–3–6 (53)	Hal Stewart	NWS	10	Mar 17, 1915	29 years, 12 days	Majestic Theatre, Fort Wayne, Indiana, U.S.	
123	Loss	62–3–6 (52)	Willie Ritchie	NWS	10	Mar 11, 1915	29 years, 6 days	Madison Square Garden, New York City, New York, U.S.	World lightweight title at stake; (via KO only)
122	Win	62–3–6 (51)	Charley White	NWS	10	Feb 25, 1915	28 years, 357 days	Auditorium, Milwaukee, Wisconsin, U.S.	World lightweight title at stake; (via KO only)
121	Win	62–3–6 (50)	Jimmy Anderson	NWS	6	Feb 15, 1915	28 years, 347 days	Grand Rapids, Michigan, U.S.	World lightweight title at stake; (via KO only)
120	Loss	62–3–6 (49)	Joe Shugrue	NWS	10	Feb 9, 1915	28 years, 341 days	Madison Square Garden, New York City, New York, U.S.	
119	Loss	62–3–6 (48)	Johnny Griffiths	NWS	12	Feb 1, 1915	28 years, 333 days	Akron, Ohio, U.S.	
118	Win	62–3–6 (47)	Willie Beecher	NWS	10	Jan 26, 1915	28 years, 327 days	Madison Square Garden, New York City, New York, U.S.	
117	Loss	62–3–6 (46)	Joe Shugrue	NWS	10	Dec 2, 1914	28 years, 272 days	Madison Square Garden, New York City, New York, U.S.	
116	Win	62–3–6 (45)	Young Abe Brown	NWS	10	Nov 26, 1914	28 years, 266 days	Arena, Syracuse, New York, U.S.	World lightweight title at stake; (via KO only)
115	Win	62–3–6 (44)	Fred Yelle	PTS	12	Nov 24, 1914	28 years, 264 days	Atlas A.A., Boston, Massachusetts, U.S.	
114	Loss	61–3–6 (44)	Lockport Jimmy Duffy	NWS	10	Nov 19, 1914	28 years, 259 days	Broadway Auditorium, Buffalo, New York, U.S.	
113	Win	61–3–6 (43)	Charley White	NWS	10	Nov 9, 1914	28 years, 249 days	Auditorium, Milwaukee, Wisconsin, U.S.	
112	Win	61–3–6 (42)	Ad Wolgast	TKO	8 (10)	Nov 2, 1914	28 years, 242 days	Madison Square Garden, New York City, New York, U.S.	
111	Win	60–3–6 (42)	Matty Baldwin	PTS	12	Oct 27, 1914	28 years, 236 days	Atlas A.A., Boston, Massachsuetts, U.S.	Retained world lightweight title
110	Win	59–3–6 (42)	Willie Ritchie	PTS	20	Jul 7, 1914	28 years, 124 days	Olympia, Kensington, London, England, U.K.	Retained IBU and Lonsdale titles; Won world lightweight title (USA version)
109	Win	58–3–6 (42)	Joe Mandot	NWS	10	May 25, 1914	28 years, 81 days	Pelican Stadium, New Orleans, Louisiana, U.S.	
108	Win	58–3–6 (41)	Leach Cross	PTS	20	Apr 28, 1914	28 years, 54 days	Arena, Vernon, California, U.S.	
107	Win	57–3–6 (41)	Mexican Joe Rivers	PTS	20	Mar 17, 1914	28 years, 12 days	Arena, Vernon, California, U.S.	
106	Loss	56–3–6 (41)	Lockport Jimmy Duffy	NWS	8	Feb 26, 1914	27 years, 358 days	Saint Louis, Missouri, U.S.	
105	Win	56–3–6 (40)	Leo Kelly	NWS	8	Jan 29, 1914	27 years, 330 days	National A.C., Saint Louis, Missouri, U.S.	
104	Win	56–3–6 (39)	Earl Fisher	NWS	10	Jan 26, 1914	27 years, 327 days	Music Hall Arena, Cincinnati, Ohio, U.S.	
103	Win	56–3–6 (38)	Mickey Sheridan	PTS	10	Jan 15, 1914	27 years, 316 days	Kansas City, Missouri, U.S.	
102	Win	55–3–6 (38)	Sam Robideau	NWS	6	Jan 10, 1914	27 years, 311 days	National A.C., Philadelphia, Pennsylvania, U.S.	
101	Win	55–3–6 (37)	Frank Ray Whitney	PTS	10	Jan 6, 1914	27 years, 307 days	Armory Auditorium, Atlanta, Georgia, U.S.	
100	Win	54–3–6 (37)	Johnny Dundee	NWS	10	Jan 1, 1914	27 years, 302 days	Pelican Stadium, New Orleans, Louisiana, U.S.	
99	Win	54–3–6 (36)	Arthur Ellis	KO	5 (?)	Dec 5, 1913	27 years, 275 days	Montreal, Quebec, Canada	
98	Win	53–3–6 (36)	Phil Bloom	NWS	10	Nov 25, 1913	27 years, 265 days	Atlantic Garden A.C., New York City, New York, U.S.	
97	Win	53–3–6 (35)	Milburn Saylor	DQ	9 (?)	Oct 20, 1913	27 years, 229 days	Winnipeg, Manitoba, Canada	
96	Win	52–3–6 (35)	Leo Kossick	PTS	12	Oct 13, 1913	27 years, 222 days	Coliseum, Billings, Montana, U.S.	
95	Win	51–3–6 (35)	Dick Hyland	PTS	12	Oct 8, 1913	27 years, 217 days	Butte, Montana, U.S.	
94	Win	50–3–6 (35)	Martin Murphy	KO	3 (?)	Jul 22, 1913	27 years, 139 days	Fernie, British Columbia, Canada	
93	Win	49–3–6 (35)	Young Jack O'Brien	PTS	15	Jul 19, 1913	27 years, 136 days	Vancouver, British Columbia, Canada	
92	Win	48–3–6 (35)	Ray Campbell	PTS	15	Jun 12, 1913	27 years, 99 days	Vancouver, British Columbia, Canada	
91	Win	47–3–6 (35)	Billy Farrell	KO	5 (?)	May 31, 1913	27 years, 87 days	Moose Jaw, Saskatchewan, Canada	
90	Win	46–3–6 (35)	Kid Scaler	NWS	15	May 24, 1913	27 years, 80 days	Thistle Rink, Edmonton, Alberta, Canada	
89	Win	46–3–6 (34)	Jack Redmond	NWS	12	May 16, 1913	27 years, 72 days	Winnipeg, Manitoba, Canada	
88	Win	46–3–6 (33)	Al Ketchell	NWS	10	Apr 28, 1913	27 years, 54 days	Park City Theater, Bridgeport, Connecticut, U.S.	
87	Win	46–3–6 (32)	Eddie Beattie	PTS	20	Mar 6, 1913	27 years, 1 day	Liverpool Stadium, Liverpool, Merseyside, England, U.K.	
86	Win	45–3–6 (32)	Raymond Vittet	TKO	10 (20)	Mar 3, 1913	26 years, 363 days	Drill Hall, Sheffield, Yorkshire, England, U.K.	Retained IBU and Lonsdale lightweight titles
85	Win	44–3–6 (32)	Young Nipper	PTS	20	Feb 28, 1913	26 years, 360 days	Canterbury Music Hall, Lambeth, London, England, U.K.	
84	Win	43–3–6 (32)	Paul Brevieres	TKO	3 (20)	Feb 10, 1913	26 years, 342 days	Market Hall, Aberdare, Wales, U.K.	Retained IBU and Lonsdale lightweight titles
83	Win	42–3–6 (32)	Hughie Mehegan	PTS	20	Dec 16, 1912	26 years, 286 days	National Sporting Club, Covent Garden, London, England, U.K.	Retained IBU and Lonsdale lightweight titles
82	Win	41–3–6 (32)	Matt Wells	PTS	20	Nov 11, 1912	26 years, 251 days	National Sporting Club, Covent Garden, London, England, U.K.	Won IBU and Lonsdale lightweight titles
81	Win	40–3–6 (32)	Jack Langdon	PTS	15	Oct 24, 1912	26 years, 233 days	Liverpool Stadium, Liverpool, Merseyside, England, U.K.	
80	Win	39–3–6 (32)	Phil Knight	NWS	12	Aug 16, 1912	26 years, 164 days	Winnipeg, Manitoba, Canada	
79	Draw	39–3–6 (31)	Grover Hayes	PTS	12	Aug 5, 1912	26 years, 153 days	Winnipeg, Manitoba, Canada	
78	Draw	39–3–5 (31)	Grover Hayes	NWS	10	Jun 13, 1912	26 years, 100 days	Columbus, Ohio, U.S.	
77	Win	39–3–5 (30)	Lockport Jimmy Duffy	NWS	10	May 22, 1912	26 years, 78 days	Convention Hall, Buffalo, New York, U.S.	
76	Win	39–3–5 (29)	Winnipeg Jack O'Brien	PTS	6	Mar 9, 1912	26 years, 4 days	Winnipeg, Manitoba, Canada	
75	Win	38–3–5 (29)	Willie Ritchie	PTS	20	Nov 30, 1911	25 years, 270 days	Arena, Vernon, California, U.S.	
74	Win	37–3–5 (29)	Matty Baldwin	PTS	20	Jun 23, 1911	25 years, 110 days	Auditorium Rink, San Francisco, California, U.S.	
73	Win	36–3–5 (29)	Philadelphia Pal Moore	NWS	10	Apr 12, 1911	25 years, 38 days	New Amsterdam Opera House, New York City, New York, U.S.	
72	Loss	36–3–5 (28)	Matt Wells	PTS	20	Feb 27, 1911	24 years, 359 days	American Skating Rink, Cardiff, Wales, U.K.	Lost IBU and Lonsdale lightweight titles
71	Win	36–2–5 (28)	Jim Driscoll	DQ	10 (20)	Dec 20, 1910	24 years, 290 days	American Skating Rink, Cardiff, Wales, U.K.	Retained IBU and Lonsdale lightweight titles; Driscoll was disqualified for head butts
70	Win	35–2–5 (28)	Dick Bailey	TKO	7 (20)	Nov 10, 1910	24 years, 251 days	Drill Hall, Burslem, Staffordshire, England, U.K.	
69	Win	34–2–5 (28)	Joe Heathcote	TKO	5 (20)	Jul 21, 1910	24 years, 138 days	Liverpool Arena, Liverpool, Merseyside, England, U.K.	
68	Draw	33–2–5 (28)	Packey McFarland	PTS	20	May 30, 1910	24 years, 86 days	National Sporting Club, Covent Garden, London, England, U.K.	Retained IBU and Lonsdale lightweight titles
67	Win	33–2–4 (28)	Jack Daniels	KO	7 (20)	Apr 25, 1910	24 years, 51 days	King's Hall, London Road, Southwark, London, England, U.K.	
66	Win	32–2–4 (28)	Johnny Summers	PTS	20	Nov 8, 1909	23 years, 248 days	National Sporting Club, Covent Garden, London, England, U.K.	Retained IBU lightweight title; Won inaugural Lonsdale lightweight title
65	Win	31–2–4 (28)	Joe Fletcher	KO	12 (20)	Sep 6, 1909	23 years, 185 days	Pavilion, Mountain Ash, Wales, U.K.	
64	Win	30–2–4 (28)	Henri Piet	RTD	2 (20)	Aug 23, 1909	23 years, 171 days	Grand Pavilion, Mountain Ash, Wales, U.K.	Won inaugural IBU lightweight title
63	Win	29–2–4 (28)	Young Joseph	DQ	11 (20)	Jul 12, 1909	23 years, 129 days	Pavilion, Mountain Ash, Wales, U.K.	
62	Win	28–2–4 (28)	Phil Brock	PTS	12	May 25, 1909	23 years, 81 days	Armory A.A., Boston, Massachusetts, U.S.	
61	Win	27–2–4 (28)	Jack Goodman	NWS	10	May 21, 1909	23 years, 77 days	Fairmont A.C., Bronx, New York City, New York, U.S.	
60	Win	27–2–4 (27)	Johnny Frayne	NWS	10	May 7, 1909	23 years, 63 days	Fairmont A.C., New York City, New York, U.S.	
59	Draw	27–2–4 (26)	Young Donahue	PTS	10	Mar 16, 1909	23 years, 11 days	New Orleans, Louisiana, U.S.	
58	Win	27–2–3 (26)	Ray Bronson	TKO	13 (20)	Mar 5, 1909	23 years, 0 days	West Side A.C., Gretna, Louisiana, U.S.	
57	Win	26–2–3 (26)	Young Erne	PTS	20	Feb 20, 1909	22 years, 352 days	New Orleans, Louisiana, U.S.	
56	Win	25–2–3 (26)	George Memsic	NWS	20	Feb 2, 1909	22 years, 334 days	McCarey's Club, Los Angeles, California, U.S.	
55	Win	25–2–3 (25)	Abe Attell	PTS	15	Nov 25, 1908	22 years, 265 days	Jeffries' Arena, Vernon, California, U.S.	
54	Win	24–2–3 (25)	Harry Trendall	KO	6 (10)	Oct 9, 1908	22 years, 218 days	Naud Junction Pavilion, Los Angeles, California, U.S.	
53	Win	23–2–3 (25)	Frank Carsey	KO	4 (10)	Sep 15, 1908	22 years, 194 days	McCarey's Pavilion, Los Angeles, California, U.S.	
52	Win	22–2–3 (25)	Johnny Murphy	PTS	25	Aug 14, 1908	22 years, 162 days	Jeffries' Arena, Vernon, California, U.S.	
51	Draw	21–2–3 (25)	Packey McFarland	PTS	25	Jul 4, 1908	22 years, 121 days	Jeffries' Arena, Vernon, California, U.S.	
50	Win	21–2–2 (25)	Phil Brock	PTS	25	May 30, 1908	22 years, 86 days	Jeffries' Arena, Vernon, California, U.S.	
49	Loss	20–2–2 (25)	Packey McFarland	PTS	10	Feb 21, 1908	21 years, 353 days	Hippodrome, Milwaukee, Wisconsin, U.S.	
48	Draw	20–1–2 (25)	Charles Neary	PTS	10	Jan 31, 1908	21 years, 332 days	Schlitz Park, Milwaukee, Wisconsin, U.S.	
47	Win	20–1–1 (25)	Maurice Sayers	PTS	10	Jan 17, 1908	21 years, 318 days	Milwaukee Boxing Club, Milwaukee, Wisconsin, U.S.	
46	Win	19–1–1 (25)	Kid Locke	NWS	6	Jan 2, 1908	21 years, 303 days	Broadway A.C., Philadelphia, Pennsylvania, U.S.	
45	Win	19–1–1 (24)	Eddie Carter	NWS	6	Dec 25, 1907	21 years, 295 days	Wayne A.C., Philadelphia, Pennsylvania, U.S.	
44	Win	19–1–1 (23)	Dave Deshler	PTS	10	Dec 11, 1907	21 years, 281 days	Chelsea, Massachsuetts, U.S.	
43	Draw	18–1–1 (23)	Willie Fitzgerald	NWS	6	Dec 2, 1907	21 years, 272 days	Spring Garden A.C., Philadelphia, Pennsylvania, U.S.	
42	Win	18–1–1 (22)	Boxer Kelly	NWS	6	Nov 21, 1907	21 years, 261 days	Broadway A.C., Philadelphia, Pennsylvania, U.S.	
41	Win	18–1–1 (21)	Cyclone Johnny Thompson	NWS	6	Nov 2, 1907	21 years, 242 days	National A.C., Philadelphia, Pennsylvania, U.S.	
40	Win	18–1–1 (20)	Gunner Hart	TKO	5 (10)	Oct 3, 1907	21 years, 212 days	Victoria Hall, Pontypridd, Wales, U.K.	
39	Win	17–1–1 (20)	Arthur Ellis	TKO	5 (10)	Oct 3, 1907	21 years, 212 days	Victoria Hall, Pontypridd, Wales, U.K.	
38	Win	16–1–1 (20)	Joe White	TKO	16 (20)	Sep 16, 1907	21 years, 195 days	Gymnasium, Pontypridd, Wales, U.K.	
37	Win	15–1–1 (20)	Seaman Arthur Hayes	TKO	5 (15)	Sep 7, 1907	21 years, 186 days	Victoria Hall, Pontypridd, Wales, U.K.	
36	ND	14–1–1 (20)	Jim Driscoll	ND	6	Sep 2, 1907	21 years, 181 days	Gess Pavillon, Pontypridd, Wales, U.K.	
35	Win	14–1–1 (19)	Dick Lee	PTS	15	Aug 15, 1907	21 years, 163 days	Welsh National A.C., Merthyr Tydfil, Wales, U.K.	Welsh claimed English 134lbs title
34	Win	13–1–1 (19)	Young Lilley	RTD	11 (20)	Aug 5, 1907	21 years, 153 days	Victoria Hall, Pontypridd, Wales, U.K.	
33	Win	12–1–1 (19)	Sid Russell	TKO	7 (15)	Jul 18, 1907	21 years, 135 days	Welsh National A.C., Merthyr Tydfil, Wales, U.K.	
32	Win	11–1–1 (19)	Johnnie Owens	TKO	7 (10)	May 20, 1907	21 years, 76 days	Victoria Hall, Pontypridd, Wales, U.K.	Won vacant Welsh lightweight title
31	Win	10–1–1 (19)	Evan Evans	KO	1 (?)	Apr 17, 1907	21 years, 43 days	Victoria Hall, Pontypridd, Wales, U.K.	
30	Win	9–1–1 (19)	Charlie Webber	KO	2 (?)	Apr 17, 1907	21 years, 43 days	Victoria Hall, Pontypridd, Wales, U.K.	
29	Win	8–1–1 (19)	Gomer Morgan	KO	3 (?)	Apr 17, 1907	21 years, 43 days	Victoria Hall, Pontypridd, Wales, U.K.	
28	Win	7–1–1 (19)	Young Joseph	PTS	15	Mar 25, 1907	21 years, 20 days	National Sporting Club, Covent Garden, London, England, U.K.	
27	Win	6–1–1 (19)	Seaman Arthur Hayes	PTS	6	Feb 18, 1907	20 years, 350 days	National Sporting Club, Covent Garden, London, England, U.K.	
26	Win	5–1–1 (19)	Kid Gleason	NWS	6	Dec 12, 1906	20 years, 282 days	Wayne A.C., Philadelphia, Pennsylvania, U.S.	
25	Win	5–1–1 (18)	Willie Moody	NWS	6	Nov 23, 1906	20 years, 263 days	Nonpareil A.C., Philadelphia, Pennsylvania, U.S.	
24	Draw	5–1–1 (17)	Jimmy Dunn	PTS	20	Nov 12, 1906	20 years, 252 days	Dayton, Ohio, U.S.	
23	Loss	5–1 (17)	Jimmy Dunn	NWS	6	Aug 31, 1906	20 years, 179 days	National A.C., Philadelphia, Pennsylvania, U.S.	
22	Win	5–1 (16)	Hock Keys	TKO	17 (20)	Jul 27, 1906	20 years, 144 days	Dayton, Ohio, U.S.	
21	Win	4–1 (16)	Young Erne	NWS	6	Jul 13, 1906	20 years, 130 days	National A.C., Philadelphia, Pennsylvania, U.S.	
20	Win	4–1 (15)	Billy Glover	NWS	6	Jun 29, 1906	20 years, 116 days	National A.C., Philadelphia, Pennsylvania, U.S.	
19	Loss	4–1 (14)	Frank Carsey	NWS	6	Jun 15, 1906	20 years, 102 days	National A.C., Philadelphia, Pennsylvania, U.S.	
18	Win	4–1 (13)	Mike Loughlin	KO	2 (6)	Jun 8, 1906	20 years, 95 days	National A.C., Philadelphia, Pennsylvania, U.S.	
17	Win	3–1 (13)	Kid Gleason	NWS	6	May 19, 1906	20 years, 75 days	National A.C., Philadelphia, Pennsylvania, U.S.	
16	Win	3–1 (12)	Jack Reardon	NWS	6	May 12, 1906	20 years, 68 days	National A.C., Philadelphia, Pennsylvania, U.S.	
15	Loss	3–1 (11)	Tim Callahan	NWS	6	May 10, 1906	20 years, 66 days	Broadway A.C., Philadelphia, Pennsylvania, U.S.	
14	Loss	3–1 (10)	Billy Willis	NWS	6	May 3, 1906	20 years, 59 days	Broadway A.C., Philadelphia, Pennsylvania, U.S.	
13	Loss	3–1 (9)	Matty Baldwin	NWS	6	Apr 23, 1906	20 years, 49 days	Washington S.C., Philadelphia, Pennsylvania, U.S.	
12	Loss	3–1 (8)	Tommy Love	NWS	6	Apr 21, 1906	20 years, 47 days	National A.C., Philadelphia, Pennsylvania, U.S.	
11	Draw	3–1 (7)	Jimmy Devine	NWS	6	Apr 19, 1906	20 years, 45 days	Broadway A.C., Philadelphia, Pennsylvania, U.S.	
10	Draw	3–1 (6)	Frank Carsey	NWS	6	Apr 14, 1906	20 years, 40 days	National A.C., Philadelphia, Pennsylvania, U.S.	
9	Loss	3–1 (5)	Billy Maharg	PTS	10	Apr 11, 1906	20 years, 37 days	Tuxedo A.C., Essington, Pennsylvania, U.S.	
8	Draw	3–0 (5)	Johnny Dohan	NWS	6	Mar 31, 1906	20 years, 26 days	National A.C., Philadelphia, Pennsylvania, U.S.	
7	Win	3–0 (4)	Eddie Lenny	PTS	10	Mar 28, 1906	20 years, 23 days	Tuxedo AC, North Essington, Pennsylvania, U.S.	
6	Win	2–0 (4)	Kid Stinger	NWS	6	Mar 24, 1906	20 years, 19 days	National A.C., Philadelphia, Pennsylvania, U.S.	
5	Win	2–0 (3)	Tommy Love	NWS	6	Mar 8, 1906	20 years, 3 days	Broadway A.C., Philadelphia, Pennsylvania, U.S.	
4	Win	2–0 (2)	Tommy Feltz	NWS	6	Feb 22, 1906	19 years, 354 days	Broadway A.C., Philadelphia, Pennsylvania, U.S.	
3	Win	2–0 (1)	Eddie Fay	TKO	5 (6)	Feb 8, 1906	19 years, 340 days	Broadway A.C., Philadelphia, Pennsylvania, U.S.	
2	Win	1–0 (1)	Johnny Kelly	NWS	6	Jan 25, 1906	19 years, 326 days	Broadway A.C., Philadelphia, Pennsylvania, U.S.	
1	Win	1–0	Young Williams	KO	6 (6)	Dec 21, 1905	19 years, 291 days	Broadway A.C., Philadelphia, Pennsylvania, U.S.	

=== Unofficial record ===
168 fights	121 wins	29 losses
By knockout	34	1
By decision	83	28
By disqualification	4	0
Draws	17	
No contests	1	

Record with the inclusion of newspaper decisions to the win/loss/draw column.

No.	Result	Record	Opponent	Type	Round	Date	Age	Location	Notes
168	Loss	121–29–17 (1)	Archie Walker	PTS	10	Apr 15, 1922	36 years, 41 days	Clermont Avenue Rink, New York City, New York, U.S.	
167	Draw	121–28–17 (1)	Clonie Tait	PTS	10	Aug 22, 1921	35 years, 170 days	Board of Trade Building, Winnipeg, Manitoba, Canada	For vacant Commonwealth lightweight title
166	Win	121–28–16 (1)	Bert Forbes	PTS	10	Aug 17, 1921	35 years, 165 days	Victoria Pavilion, Calgary, Alberta, Canada	
165	Win	120–28–16 (1)	Tommy Kid Murphy	TKO	2 (10)	May 4, 1921	35 years, 60 days	Morristown, New Jersey, U.S.	
164	Win	119–28–16 (1)	Willie Jackson	KO	8 (10)	May 3, 1921	35 years, 59 days	Summit, New Jersey, U.S.	
163	Win	118–28–16 (1)	Willie Green	TKO	4 (12)	Dec 28, 1920	34 years, 298 days	Newark, New Jersey, U.S.	
162	Loss	117–28–16 (1)	Benny Leonard	TKO	9 (10)	May 28, 1917	31 years, 84 days	Manhattan Casino, New York City, New York, U.S.	Lost world lightweight title
161	Loss	117–27–16 (1)	Johnny Kilbane	NWS	10	May 1, 1917	31 years, 57 days	Manhattan Casino, New York City, New York, U.S.	
160	Loss	117–26–16 (1)	Chick Simler	NWS	10	Apr 24, 1917	31 years, 50 days	Town Hall, Scranton, Pennsylvania, U.S.	
159	Loss	117–25–16 (1)	Rocky Kansas	NWS	10	Apr 20, 1917	31 years, 46 days	Broadway Auditorium, Buffalo, New York, U.S.	
158	Win	117–24–16 (1)	Battling Nelson	NWS	12	Apr 17, 1917	31 years, 43 days	Coliseum, Saint Louis, Missouri, U.S.	World lightweight title at stake; (via KO only)
157	Loss	116–24–16 (1)	Richie Mitchell	NWS	6	Jan 16, 1917	30 years, 317 days	Auditorium, Milwaukee, Wisconsin, U.S.	
156	Loss	116–23–16 (1)	Eddie Wallace	NWS	6	Nov 24, 1916	30 years, 264 days	Sohmer Park, Montreal, Quebec, Canada	
155	Loss	116–22–16 (1)	Buck Fleming	NWS	6	Nov 20, 1916	30 years, 260 days	Olympia A.C., Philadelphia, Pennsylvania, U.S.	
154	Win	116–21–16 (1)	Frankie Maguire	NWS	6	Nov 3, 1916	30 years, 243 days	Mishler Theatre, Altoona, Pennsylvania, U.S.	
153	Win	115–21–16 (1)	Ben Allen	PTS	10	Oct 28, 1916	30 years, 237 days	Quebec City, Quebec, Canada	
152	Win	114–21–16 (1)	Mike Ward	TKO	4 (?)	Oct 26, 1916	30 years, 235 days	Ottawa, Ontario, Canada	
151	Win	113–21–16 (1)	Bobby Wilson	TKO	7 (10)	Oct 25, 1916	30 years, 234 days	Sohmer Park, Montreal, Quebec, Canada	
150	Draw	112–21–16 (1)	Kid Scaler	NWS	6	Sep 25, 1916	30 years, 204 days	Victoria Pavilion, Calgary, Alberta, Canada	
149	Win	112–21–15 (1)	Harry Anderson	PTS	4	Sep 22, 1916	30 years, 201 days	Arena, Seattle, Washington, U.S.	Retained world lightweight title
148	Win	111–21–15 (1)	Charley White	PTS	20	Sep 4, 1916	30 years, 183 days	Ramona A.C. Arena, Colorado Springs, Colorado, U.S.	Retained world lightweight title
147	Win	110–21–15 (1)	Benny Leonard	NWS	10	Jul 28, 1916	30 years, 145 days	Washington Park A.C., New York City, New York, U.S.	
146	Win	109–21–15 (1)	Ad Wolgast	DQ	11 (15)	Jul 4, 1916	30 years, 121 days	Stockyards Stadium, Denver, Colorado, U.S.	Retained world lightweight title
145	Win	108–21–15 (1)	Tommy Lowe	PTS	10	Jun 8, 1916	30 years, 95 days	Capitol City A.C., Ardmore, Maryland, U.S.	
144	Draw	107–21–15 (1)	Frankie Maguire	NWS	6	May 3, 1916	30 years, 59 days	Chestnut Street Auditorium, Harrisburg, Pennsylvania, U.S.	
143	Loss	107–21–14 (1)	Ever Hammer	NWS	10	Apr 24, 1916	30 years, 50 days	Auditorium, Milwaukee, Wisconsin, U.S.	
142	Draw	107–20–14 (1)	Richie Mitchell	NWS	10	Apr 7, 1916	30 years, 33 days	Auditorium, Milwaukee, Wisconsin, U.S.	
141	Loss	107–20–13 (1)	Benny Leonard	NWS	10	Mar 31, 1916	30 years, 26 days	Madison Square Garden, New York City, New York, U.S.	World lightweight title at stake; (via KO only)
140	Win	107–19–13 (1)	Frank Ray Whitney	TKO	6 (?)	Mar 24, 1916	30 years, 19 days	Harlem S.C., Harlem, New York City, New York, U.S.	
139	Win	106–19–13 (1)	Phil Bloom	NWS	10	Mar 21, 1916	30 years, 16 days	Broadway Arena, New York City, New York, U.S.	
138	Win	105–19–13 (1)	Ad Wolgast	NWS	10	Mar 6, 1916	30 years, 1 day	Arcadia Rink, Milwaukee, Wisconsin, U.S.	
137	Loss	104–19–13 (1)	Johnny Griffiths	NWS	12	Jan 25, 1916	29 years, 326 days	Akron, Ohio, U.S.	
136	Loss	104–18–13 (1)	Eddie McAndrews	NWS	6	Jan 17, 1916	29 years, 318 days	Olympia A.C., Philadelphia, Pennsylvania, U.S.	
135	Win	104–17–13 (1)	Frank Ray Whitney	NWS	10	Jan 1, 1916	29 years, 302 days	Casino Skating Rink, Atlanta, Georgia, U.S.	
134	Loss	103–17–13 (1)	Jimmy Murphy	NWS	6	Dec 13, 1915	29 years, 283 days	Olympia A.C., Philadelphia, Pennsylvania, U.S.	
133	Draw	103–16–13 (1)	Benny Palmer	NWS	8	Dec 9, 1915	29 years, 279 days	Memphis, Tennessee, U.S.	
132	Win	103–16–12 (1)	Johnny O'Leary	NWS	12	Nov 15, 1915	29 years, 255 days	Amphitheatre Rink, Winnipeg, Manitoba, Canada	World lightweight title at stake; (via KO only)
131	Loss	102–16–12 (1)	Charley White	NWS	10	Jul 3, 1915	29 years, 120 days	Brighton Beach A.C., New York City, New York, U.S.	
130	Win	102–15–12 (1)	Johnny Lustig	NWS	10	Jun 18, 1915	29 years, 105 days	Ebbets Field, New York City, New York, U.S.	
129	Win	101–15–12 (1)	Frankie Fleming	NWS	10	May 24, 1915	29 years, 80 days	Sohmer Park, Montreal, Quebec, Canada	World lightweight title at stake; (via KO only)
128	Win	100–15–12 (1)	Red Watson	NWS	10	Apr 20, 1915	29 years, 46 days	Hudson, Wisconsin, U.S.	
127	Win	99–15–12 (1)	Billy Wagner	NWS	10	Apr 9, 1915	29 years, 35 days	Coliseum, Toledo, Ohio, U.S.	World lightweight title at stake; (via KO only)
126	Draw	98–15–12 (1)	Johnny Lustig	NWS	10	Mar 27, 1915	29 years, 22 days	Montreal, Quebec, Canada	
125	Win	98–15–11 (1)	Patsy Drouillard	NWS	10	Mar 24, 1915	29 years, 19 days	Windsor A.C., Windsor, Ontario, Canada	
124	Win	97–15–11 (1)	Hal Stewart	NWS	10	Mar 17, 1915	29 years, 12 days	Majestic Theatre, Fort Wayne, Indiana, U.S.	
123	Loss	96–15–11 (1)	Willie Ritchie	NWS	10	Mar 11, 1915	29 years, 6 days	Madison Square Garden, New York City, New York, U.S.	World lightweight title at stake; (via KO only)
122	Win	96–14–11 (1)	Charley White	NWS	10	Feb 25, 1915	28 years, 357 days	Auditorium, Milwaukee, Wisconsin, U.S.	World lightweight title at stake; (via KO only)
121	Win	95–14–11 (1)	Jimmy Anderson	NWS	6	Feb 15, 1915	28 years, 347 days	Grand Rapids, Michigan, U.S.	World lightweight title at stake; (via KO only)
120	Loss	94–14–11 (1)	Joe Shugrue	NWS	10	Feb 9, 1915	28 years, 341 days	Madison Square Garden, New York City, New York, U.S.	
119	Loss	94–13–11 (1)	Johnny Griffiths	NWS	12	Feb 1, 1915	28 years, 333 days	Akron, Ohio, U.S.	
118	Win	94–12–11 (1)	Willie Beecher	NWS	10	Jan 26, 1915	28 years, 327 days	Madison Square Garden, New York City, New York, U.S.	
117	Loss	93–12–11 (1)	Joe Shugrue	NWS	10	Dec 2, 1914	28 years, 272 days	Madison Square Garden, New York City, New York, U.S.	
116	Win	93–11–11 (1)	Young Abe Brown	NWS	10	Nov 26, 1914	28 years, 266 days	Arena, Syracuse, New York, U.S.	World lightweight title at stake; (via KO only)
115	Win	92–11–11 (1)	Fred Yelle	PTS	12	Nov 24, 1914	28 years, 264 days	Atlas A.A., Boston, Massachusetts, U.S.	
114	Loss	91–11–11 (1)	Lockport Jimmy Duffy	NWS	10	Nov 19, 1914	28 years, 259 days	Broadway Auditorium, Buffalo, New York, U.S.	
113	Win	91–10–11 (1)	Charley White	NWS	10	Nov 9, 1914	28 years, 249 days	Auditorium, Milwaukee, Wisconsin, U.S.	
112	Win	90–10–11 (1)	Ad Wolgast	TKO	8 (10)	Nov 2, 1914	28 years, 242 days	Madison Square Garden, New York City, New York, U.S.	
111	Win	89–10–11 (1)	Matty Baldwin	PTS	12	Oct 27, 1914	28 years, 236 days	Atlas A.A., Boston, Massachsuetts, U.S.	Retained world lightweight title
110	Win	88–10–11 (1)	Willie Ritchie	PTS	20	Jul 7, 1914	28 years, 124 days	Olympia, Kensington, London, England, U.K.	Retained IBU and Lonsdale titles; Won world lightweight title (USA version)
109	Win	87–10–11 (1)	Joe Mandot	NWS	10	May 25, 1914	28 years, 81 days	Pelican Stadium, New Orleans, Louisiana, U.S.	
108	Win	86–10–11 (1)	Leach Cross	PTS	20	Apr 28, 1914	28 years, 54 days	Arena, Vernon, California, U.S.	
107	Win	85–10–11 (1)	Mexican Joe Rivers	PTS	20	Mar 17, 1914	28 years, 12 days	Arena, Vernon, California, U.S.	
106	Loss	84–10–11 (1)	Lockport Jimmy Duffy	NWS	8	Feb 26, 1914	27 years, 358 days	Saint Louis, Missouri, U.S.	
105	Win	84–9–11 (1)	Leo Kelly	NWS	8	Jan 29, 1914	27 years, 330 days	National A.C., Saint Louis, Missouri, U.S.	
104	Win	83–9–11 (1)	Earl Fisher	NWS	10	Jan 26, 1914	27 years, 327 days	Music Hall Arena, Cincinnati, Ohio, U.S.	
103	Win	82–9–11 (1)	Mickey Sheridan	PTS	10	Jan 15, 1914	27 years, 316 days	Kansas City, Missouri, U.S.	
102	Win	81–9–11 (1)	Sam Robideau	NWS	6	Jan 10, 1914	27 years, 311 days	National A.C., Philadelphia, Pennsylvania, U.S.	
101	Win	80–9–11 (1)	Frank Ray Whitney	PTS	10	Jan 6, 1914	27 years, 307 days	Armory Auditorium, Atlanta, Georgia, U.S.	
100	Win	79–9–11 (1)	Johnny Dundee	NWS	10	Jan 1, 1914	27 years, 302 days	Pelican Stadium, New Orleans, Louisiana, U.S.	
99	Win	78–9–11 (1)	Arthur Ellis	KO	5 (?)	Dec 5, 1913	27 years, 275 days	Montreal, Quebec, Canada	
98	Win	77–9–11 (1)	Phil Bloom	NWS	10	Nov 25, 1913	27 years, 265 days	Atlantic Garden A.C., New York City, New York, U.S.	
97	Win	76–9–11 (1)	Milburn Saylor	DQ	9 (?)	Oct 20, 1913	27 years, 229 days	Winnipeg, Manitoba, Canada	
96	Win	75–9–11 (1)	Leo Kossick	PTS	12	Oct 13, 1913	27 years, 222 days	Coliseum, Billings, Montana, U.S.	
95	Win	74–9–11 (1)	Dick Hyland	PTS	12	Oct 8, 1913	27 years, 217 days	Butte, Montana, U.S.	
94	Win	73–9–11 (1)	Martin Murphy	KO	3 (?)	Jul 22, 1913	27 years, 139 days	Fernie, British Columbia, Canada	
93	Win	72–9–11 (1)	Young Jack O'Brien	PTS	15	Jul 19, 1913	27 years, 136 days	Vancouver, British Columbia, Canada	
92	Win	71–9–11 (1)	Ray Campbell	PTS	15	Jun 12, 1913	27 years, 99 days	Vancouver, British Columbia, Canada	
91	Win	70–9–11 (1)	Billy Farrell	KO	5 (?)	May 31, 1913	27 years, 87 days	Moose Jaw, Saskatchewan, Canada	
90	Win	69–9–11 (1)	Kid Scaler	NWS	15	May 24, 1913	27 years, 80 days	Thistle Rink, Edmonton, Alberta, Canada	
89	Win	68–9–11 (1)	Jack Redmond	NWS	12	May 16, 1913	27 years, 72 days	Winnipeg, Manitoba, Canada	
88	Win	67–9–11 (1)	Al Ketchell	NWS	10	Apr 28, 1913	27 years, 54 days	Park City Theater, Bridgeport, Connecticut, U.S.	
87	Win	66–9–11 (1)	Eddie Beattie	PTS	20	Mar 6, 1913	27 years, 1 day	Liverpool Stadium, Liverpool, Merseyside, England, U.K.	
86	Win	65–9–11 (1)	Raymond Vittet	TKO	10 (20)	Mar 3, 1913	26 years, 363 days	Drill Hall, Sheffield, Yorkshire, England, U.K.	Retained IBU and Lonsdale lightweight titles
85	Win	64–9–11 (1)	Young Nipper	PTS	20	Feb 28, 1913	26 years, 360 days	Canterbury Music Hall, Lambeth, London, England, U.K.	
84	Win	63–9–11 (1)	Paul Brevieres	TKO	3 (20)	Feb 10, 1913	26 years, 342 days	Market Hall, Aberdare, Wales, U.K.	Retained IBU and Lonsdale lightweight titles
83	Win	62–9–11 (1)	Hughie Mehegan	PTS	20	Dec 16, 1912	26 years, 286 days	National Sporting Club, Covent Garden, London, England, U.K.	Retained IBU and Lonsdale lightweight titles
82	Win	61–9–11 (1)	Matt Wells	PTS	20	Nov 11, 1912	26 years, 251 days	National Sporting Club, Covent Garden, London, England, U.K.	Won IBU and Lonsdale lightweight titles
81	Win	60–9–11 (1)	Jack Langdon	PTS	15	Oct 24, 1912	26 years, 233 days	Liverpool Stadium, Liverpool, Merseyside, England, U.K.	
80	Win	59–9–11 (1)	Phil Knight	NWS	12	Aug 16, 1912	26 years, 164 days	Winnipeg, Manitoba, Canada	
79	Draw	58–9–11 (1)	Grover Hayes	PTS	12	Aug 5, 1912	26 years, 153 days	Winnipeg, Manitoba, Canada	
78	Draw	58–9–10 (1)	Grover Hayes	NWS	10	Jun 13, 1912	26 years, 100 days	Columbus, Ohio, U.S.	
77	Win	58–9–9 (1)	Lockport Jimmy Duffy	NWS	10	May 22, 1912	26 years, 78 days	Convention Hall, Buffalo, New York, U.S.	
76	Win	57–9–9 (1)	Winnipeg Jack O'Brien	PTS	6	Mar 9, 1912	26 years, 4 days	Winnipeg, Manitoba, Canada	
75	Win	56–9–9 (1)	Willie Ritchie	PTS	20	Nov 30, 1911	25 years, 270 days	Arena, Vernon, California, U.S.	
74	Win	55–9–9 (1)	Matty Baldwin	PTS	20	Jun 23, 1911	25 years, 110 days	Auditorium Rink, San Francisco, California, U.S.	
73	Win	54–9–9 (1)	Philadelphia Pal Moore	NWS	10	Apr 12, 1911	25 years, 38 days	New Amsterdam Opera House, New York City, New York, U.S.	
72	Loss	53–9–9 (1)	Matt Wells	PTS	20	Feb 27, 1911	24 years, 359 days	American Skating Rink, Cardiff, Wales, U.K.	Lost IBU and Lonsdale lightweight titles
71	Win	53–8–9 (1)	Jim Driscoll	DQ	10 (20)	Dec 20, 1910	24 years, 290 days	American Skating Rink, Cardiff, Wales, U.K.	Retained IBU and Lonsdale lightweight titles; Driscoll was disqualified for head butts
70	Win	52–8–9 (1)	Dick Bailey	TKO	7 (20)	Nov 10, 1910	24 years, 251 days	Drill Hall, Burslem, Staffordshire, England, U.K.	
69	Win	51–8–9 (1)	Joe Heathcote	TKO	5 (20)	Jul 21, 1910	24 years, 138 days	Liverpool Arena, Liverpool, Merseyside, England, U.K.	
68	Draw	50–8–9 (1)	Packey McFarland	PTS	20	May 30, 1910	24 years, 86 days	National Sporting Club, Covent Garden, London, England, U.K.	Retained IBU and Lonsdale lightweight titles
67	Win	50–8–8 (1)	Jack Daniels	KO	7 (20)	Apr 25, 1910	24 years, 51 days	King's Hall, London Road, Southwark, London, England, U.K.	
66	Win	49–8–8 (1)	Johnny Summers	PTS	20	Nov 8, 1909	23 years, 248 days	National Sporting Club, Covent Garden, London, England, U.K.	Retained IBU lightweight title; Won inaugural Lonsdale lightweight title
65	Win	48–8–8 (1)	Joe Fletcher	KO	12 (20)	Sep 6, 1909	23 years, 185 days	Pavilion, Mountain Ash, Wales, U.K.	
64	Win	47–8–8 (1)	Henri Piet	RTD	2 (20)	Aug 23, 1909	23 years, 171 days	Grand Pavilion, Mountain Ash, Wales, U.K.	Won inaugural IBU lightweight title
63	Win	46–8–8 (1)	Young Joseph	DQ	11 (20)	Jul 12, 1909	23 years, 129 days	Pavilion, Mountain Ash, Wales, U.K.	
62	Win	45–8–8 (1)	Phil Brock	PTS	12	May 25, 1909	23 years, 81 days	Armory A.A., Boston, Massachusetts, U.S.	
61	Win	44–8–8 (1)	Jack Goodman	NWS	10	May 21, 1909	23 years, 77 days	Fairmont A.C., Bronx, New York City, New York, U.S.	
60	Win	43–8–8 (1)	Johnny Frayne	NWS	10	May 7, 1909	23 years, 63 days	Fairmont A.C., New York City, New York, U.S.	
59	Draw	42–8–8 (1)	Young Donahue	PTS	10	Mar 16, 1909	23 years, 11 days	New Orleans, Louisiana, U.S.	
58	Win	42–8–7 (1)	Ray Bronson	TKO	13 (20)	Mar 5, 1909	23 years, 0 days	West Side A.C., Gretna, Louisiana, U.S.	
57	Win	41–8–7 (1)	Young Erne	PTS	20	Feb 20, 1909	22 years, 352 days	New Orleans, Louisiana, U.S.	
56	Win	40–8–7 (1)	George Memsic	NWS	20	Feb 2, 1909	22 years, 334 days	McCarey's Club, Los Angeles, California, U.S.	
55	Win	39–8–7 (1)	Abe Attell	PTS	15	Nov 25, 1908	22 years, 265 days	Jeffries' Arena, Vernon, California, U.S.	
54	Win	38–8–7 (1)	Harry Trendall	KO	6 (10)	Oct 9, 1908	22 years, 218 days	Naud Junction Pavilion, Los Angeles, California, U.S.	
53	Win	37–8–7 (1)	Frank Carsey	KO	4 (10)	Sep 15, 1908	22 years, 194 days	McCarey's Pavilion, Los Angeles, California, U.S.	
52	Win	36–8–7 (1)	Johnny Murphy	PTS	25	Aug 14, 1908	22 years, 162 days	Jeffries' Arena, Vernon, California, U.S.	
51	Draw	35–8–7 (1)	Packey McFarland	PTS	25	Jul 4, 1908	22 years, 121 days	Jeffries' Arena, Vernon, California, U.S.	
50	Win	35–8–6 (1)	Phil Brock	PTS	25	May 30, 1908	22 years, 86 days	Jeffries' Arena, Vernon, California, U.S.	
49	Loss	34–8–6 (1)	Packey McFarland	PTS	10	Feb 21, 1908	21 years, 353 days	Hippodrome, Milwaukee, Wisconsin, U.S.	
48	Draw	34–7–6 (1)	Charles Neary	PTS	10	Jan 31, 1908	21 years, 332 days	Schlitz Park, Milwaukee, Wisconsin, U.S.	
47	Win	34–7–5 (1)	Maurice Sayers	PTS	10	Jan 17, 1908	21 years, 318 days	Milwaukee Boxing Club, Milwaukee, Wisconsin, U.S.	
46	Win	33–7–5 (1)	Kid Locke	NWS	6	Jan 2, 1908	21 years, 303 days	Broadway A.C., Philadelphia, Pennsylvania, U.S.	
45	Win	32–7–5 (1)	Eddie Carter	NWS	6	Dec 25, 1907	21 years, 295 days	Wayne A.C., Philadelphia, Pennsylvania, U.S.	
44	Win	31–7–5 (1)	Dave Deshler	PTS	10	Dec 11, 1907	21 years, 281 days	Chelsea, Massachsuetts, U.S.	
43	Draw	30–7–5 (1)	Willie Fitzgerald	NWS	6	Dec 2, 1907	21 years, 272 days	Spring Garden A.C., Philadelphia, Pennsylvania, U.S.	
42	Win	30–7–4 (1)	Boxer Kelly	NWS	6	Nov 21, 1907	21 years, 261 days	Broadway A.C., Philadelphia, Pennsylvania, U.S.	
41	Win	29–7–4 (1)	Cyclone Johnny Thompson	NWS	6	Nov 2, 1907	21 years, 242 days	National A.C., Philadelphia, Pennsylvania, U.S.	
40	Win	28–7–4 (1)	Gunner Hart	TKO	5 (10)	Oct 3, 1907	21 years, 212 days	Victoria Hall, Pontypridd, Wales, U.K.	
39	Win	27–7–4 (1)	Arthur Ellis	TKO	5 (10)	Oct 3, 1907	21 years, 212 days	Victoria Hall, Pontypridd, Wales, U.K.	
38	Win	26–7–4 (1)	Joe White	TKO	16 (20)	Sep 16, 1907	21 years, 195 days	Gymnasium, Pontypridd, Wales, U.K.	
37	Win	25–7–4 (1)	Seaman Arthur Hayes	TKO	5 (15)	Sep 7, 1907	21 years, 186 days	Victoria Hall, Pontypridd, Wales, U.K.	
36	ND	24–7–4 (1)	Jim Driscoll	ND	6	Sep 2, 1907	21 years, 181 days	Gess Pavillon, Pontypridd, Wales, U.K.	
35	Win	24–7–4	Dick Lee	PTS	15	Aug 15, 1907	21 years, 163 days	Welsh National A.C., Merthyr Tydfil, Wales, U.K.	Welsh claimed English 134lbs title
34	Win	23–7–4	Young Lilley	RTD	11 (20)	Aug 5, 1907	21 years, 153 days	Victoria Hall, Pontypridd, Wales, U.K.	
33	Win	22–7–4	Sid Russell	TKO	7 (15)	Jul 18, 1907	21 years, 135 days	Welsh National A.C., Merthyr Tydfil, Wales, U.K.	
32	Win	21–7–4	Johnnie Owens	TKO	7 (10)	May 20, 1907	21 years, 76 days	Victoria Hall, Pontypridd, Wales, U.K.	Won vacant Welsh lightweight title
31	Win	20–7–4	Evan Evans	KO	1 (?)	Apr 17, 1907	21 years, 43 days	Victoria Hall, Pontypridd, Wales, U.K.	
30	Win	19–7–4	Charlie Webber	KO	2 (?)	Apr 17, 1907	21 years, 43 days	Victoria Hall, Pontypridd, Wales, U.K.	
29	Win	18–7–4	Gomer Morgan	KO	3 (?)	Apr 17, 1907	21 years, 43 days	Victoria Hall, Pontypridd, Wales, U.K.	
28	Win	17–7–4	Young Joseph	PTS	15	Mar 25, 1907	21 years, 20 days	National Sporting Club, Covent Garden, London, England, U.K.	
27	Win	16–7–4	Seaman Arthur Hayes	PTS	6	Feb 18, 1907	20 years, 350 days	National Sporting Club, Covent Garden, London, England, U.K.	
26	Win	15–7–4	Kid Gleason	NWS	6	Dec 12, 1906	20 years, 282 days	Wayne A.C., Philadelphia, Pennsylvania, U.S.	
25	Win	14–7–4	Willie Moody	NWS	6	Nov 23, 1906	20 years, 263 days	Nonpareil A.C., Philadelphia, Pennsylvania, U.S.	
24	Draw	13–7–4	Jimmy Dunn	PTS	20	Nov 12, 1906	20 years, 252 days	Dayton, Ohio, U.S.	
23	Loss	13–7–3	Jimmy Dunn	NWS	6	Aug 31, 1906	20 years, 179 days	National A.C., Philadelphia, Pennsylvania, U.S.	
22	Win	13–6–3	Hock Keys	TKO	17 (20)	Jul 27, 1906	20 years, 144 days	Dayton, Ohio, U.S.	
21	Win	12–6–3	Young Erne	NWS	6	Jul 13, 1906	20 years, 130 days	National A.C., Philadelphia, Pennsylvania, U.S.	
20	Win	11–6–3	Billy Glover	NWS	6	Jun 29, 1906	20 years, 116 days	National A.C., Philadelphia, Pennsylvania, U.S.	
19	Loss	10–6–3	Frank Carsey	NWS	6	Jun 15, 1906	20 years, 102 days	National A.C., Philadelphia, Pennsylvania, U.S.	
18	Win	10–5–3	Mike Loughlin	KO	2 (6)	Jun 8, 1906	20 years, 95 days	National A.C., Philadelphia, Pennsylvania, U.S.	
17	Win	9–5–3	Kid Gleason	NWS	6	May 19, 1906	20 years, 75 days	National A.C., Philadelphia, Pennsylvania, U.S.	
16	Win	8–5–3	Jack Reardon	NWS	6	May 12, 1906	20 years, 68 days	National A.C., Philadelphia, Pennsylvania, U.S.	
15	Loss	7–5–3	Tim Callahan	NWS	6	May 10, 1906	20 years, 66 days	Broadway A.C., Philadelphia, Pennsylvania, U.S.	
14	Loss	7–4–3	Billy Willis	NWS	6	May 3, 1906	20 years, 59 days	Broadway A.C., Philadelphia, Pennsylvania, U.S.	
13	Loss	7–3–3	Matty Baldwin	NWS	6	Apr 23, 1906	20 years, 49 days	Washington S.C., Philadelphia, Pennsylvania, U.S.	
12	Loss	7–2–3	Tommy Love	NWS	6	Apr 21, 1906	20 years, 47 days	National A.C., Philadelphia, Pennsylvania, U.S.	
11	Draw	7–1–3	Jimmy Devine	NWS	6	Apr 19, 1906	20 years, 45 days	Broadway A.C., Philadelphia, Pennsylvania, U.S.	
10	Draw	7–1–2	Frank Carsey	NWS	6	Apr 14, 1906	20 years, 40 days	National A.C., Philadelphia, Pennsylvania, U.S.	
9	Loss	7–1–1	Billy Maharg	PTS	10	Apr 11, 1906	20 years, 37 days	Tuxedo A.C., Essington, Pennsylvania, U.S.	
8	Draw	7–0–1	Johnny Dohan	NWS	6	Mar 31, 1906	20 years, 26 days	National A.C., Philadelphia, Pennsylvania, U.S.	
7	Win	7–0	Eddie Lenny	PTS	10	Mar 28, 1906	20 years, 23 days	Tuxedo AC, North Essington, Pennsylvania, U.S.	
6	Win	6–0	Kid Stinger	NWS	6	Mar 24, 1906	20 years, 19 days	National A.C., Philadelphia, Pennsylvania, U.S.	
5	Win	5–0	Tommy Love	NWS	6	Mar 8, 1906	20 years, 3 days	Broadway A.C., Philadelphia, Pennsylvania, U.S.	
4	Win	4–0	Tommy Feltz	NWS	6	Feb 22, 1906	19 years, 354 days	Broadway A.C., Philadelphia, Pennsylvania, U.S.	
3	Win	3–0	Eddie Fay	TKO	5 (6)	Feb 8, 1906	19 years, 340 days	Broadway A.C., Philadelphia, Pennsylvania, U.S.	
2	Win	2–0	Johnny Kelly	NWS	6	Jan 25, 1906	19 years, 326 days	Broadway A.C., Philadelphia, Pennsylvania, U.S.	
1	Win	1–0	Young Williams	KO	6 (6)	Dec 21, 1905	19 years, 291 days	Broadway A.C., Philadelphia, Pennsylvania, U.S.	

== See also ==
- List of Welsh boxing world champions
- Lineal championship
- List of British lightweight boxing champions
- List of European Boxing Union lightweight champions

== Bibliography ==
- Gallimore, Andrew (2006). Occupation: Prizefighter: The Freddie Welsh Story. Bridgend, Wales: Seren. ISBN 978-1-85411-395-5.
- Harris, Gareth (2004). Freddie Welsh: World Champion Lightweight Boxer, Pontypridd Legend. Pontypridd: Coalopolis Publishing. ASIN B001PCRAGO.
- Stead, Peter; Williams, Gareth, eds. (2008). Wales and Its Boxers: The Fighting Tradition. Cardiff: University of Wales Press. ISBN 978-0-7083-1915-4.

Achievements
Preceded by Willie Ritchie	World Lightweight Champion; 7 July 1914 – 28 May 1917	Succeeded by Benny Leonard
