= Lloyd's sign =

Medical sign

Lloyd's sign indicates the presence of renal calculus or pyelonephritis when pain is elicited by deep percussion in the back between the 12th rib and the spine. It is closely related to costovertebral angle tenderness, as the area of percussion is the same. However, Lloyd's sign is specifically defined as positive costovertebral angle tenderness along with the absence of tenderness when normal pressure is applied.
