= List of medical abbreviations: C =

Sortable table
Abbreviation	Meaning
c̅	(c with an overbar) with (from Latin cum)
C	cytosine cervical vertebrae
C1	atlas – first cervical vertebra of the spine
C2	axis – second cervical vertebra of the spine
CA	carcinoma cancer
Ca	calcium carcinoma cancer
CAA	coronary artery aneurysm
c/b	complicated by
CABG	coronary artery bypass graft (pronounced "cabbage")
CABP	coronary artery bypass procedure
CAD	coronary artery disease
CADASIL	cerebral autosomal dominant arteriopathy with subcortical infarcts and leukoencephalopathy
CAG	coronary artery graft coronary angiography
CAGE	cut down, annoyed, guilty, eye opener (screening for alcoholism)
CAGS	coronary artery graft surgery
cAMP	cyclic adenosine monophosphate
CAH	chronic active hepatitis congenital adrenal hyperplasia
CAKUT	congenital abnormalities of the kidney and urinary tract, see bladder outlet obstruction
CALLA	common acute lymphocytic leukemia antigen
CALM	café au lait macules
CAM	cell adhesion molecule complementary and alternative medicine
CAMP	cyclic adenosine monophosphate
CAP	community-acquired pneumonia
CAPD	continuous ambulatory peritoneal dialysis
CAO	conscious, alert, and oriented (no altered level of consciousness)
CaOx	calcium oxalate
Caps	capsule
CAs	congenital anomalies, see birth defect
CAS	childhood apraxia of speech
CAT / CT	computed axial tomography / computed tomography
Cath	catheter
CAUTI	Catheter-associated urinary tract infection
CBA	cost–benefit analysis (of treatment methods)
CBC/DIFF	complete blood count/differential
CBD	common bile duct
CBE	clinical breast examination
CBF	cerebral blood flow
CBI	continuous bladder irrigation, as in Hematuria (Acute clot retention)
CBS	chronic brain syndrome
CC cc	cubic centimeter (use ml instead—see the list of abbreviations used in prescriptions) chief complaint cardiac catheter carbon copy closing capacity
CCA	clear cell adenocarcinoma
CCB	calcium channel blocker
CCCU	critical coronary care unit
CCE; C/C/E	clubbing, cyanosis, and edema (general signs of cardiovascular disease)
CCG	Clinical commissioning group
CCF	congestive cardiac failure
CCK	cholecystokinin
CCK-PZ	cholecystokinin-pancreozymin
CCNS	cell cycle–nonspecific [drug] (a type of drug used in chemotherapy)
CCOC	clear cell odontogenic carcinoma
CCOT	calcifying cystic odontogenic tumor (formerly called calcifying odontogenic cyst)
CCP	cyclic citrullinated peptide
CCR	cardiocerebral resuscitation
CCU	coronary care unit critical care unit
CD	Celiac disease Crohn's disease chemical dependency cluster of differentiation controlled delivery
CDAD	Clostridioides difficile–associated diarrhoea
CDC	Centers for Disease Control and Prevention
CDGP	constitutional delay of growth and puberty
CDH	congenital dislocated hip
CDI	central diabetes insipidus Clostridioides difficile infection cool, dry, intact (when referring to incision/surgical sites) or clean, dry, intact when referring to bandages/dressings
CDMR	caesarean delivery on maternal request
CDP	cytosine diphosphate
CDR	cutaneous drug reaction
CDx	companion diagnostic
CEA	carcinoembryonic antigen carotid endarterectomy cost-effectiveness analysis
CEIOL	cataract extraction with intraocular lens placement
CF	cystic fibrosis
CFA	complement-fixing antibody colonization factor antigen
CFIDS	chronic fatigue immune dysfunction syndrome
CFR	case fatality rate
CFS	chronic fatigue syndrome
CFT	complement fixation test capillary filling time
CFTR	cystic fibrosis transmembrane conductance regulator
CFU	colony-forming unit
CGD	chronic granulomatous disease constitutional growth delay
CGI	Clinical global impression (including subscales such as CGI-BP, CGI-C, CGI-E, CGI-I, CGI-S)
cGMP	cyclic guanosine monophosphate
CGN	chronic glomerulonephritis
CH	congenital hypothyroidism
CHC	combined hormonal contraceptive
CHD	chronic heart disease congenital heart defect coronary heart disease
ChE	cholinesterase
CHEM-7	a group of blood tests, commonly called a basic metabolic panel (blood urea nitrogen, carbon dioxide, creatinine, glucose, serum chloride, serum potassium, serum sodium)
CHEM-20	a group of blood tests (albumin, alkaline phosphatase, alanine transaminase, aspartate aminotransferase, blood urea nitrogen, calcium – serum, serum chloride, carbon dioxide, creatinine, direct bilirubin, gamma-glutamyl transpeptidase, glucose test, lactate dehydrogenase, phosphorus – serum, potassium test, serum sodium, total bilirubin, total cholesterol, total protein, uric acid)
CHE	cholinesterase
CHF	congestive heart failure continuous hemofiltration
CHIP	clonal hematopoiesis of indeterminate potential
CHO	carbohydrate
CHOP	cyclophosphamide, doxorubicin (a.k.a. hydroxydaunorubicin), vincristine(a.k.a. Oncovin), prednisone (chemotherapy regimen)
Chol	cholesterol
CHS	cannulated hip screw
ChT	chemotherapy
CHT	congenital hypothyroidism
CI	confidence interval cardiac index
CIB	cibus (food)
CICU	cardiac intensive care unit
CIDP	chronic inflammatory demyelinating polyneuropathy
CIMF	chronic idiopathic myelofibrosis
CIN	cervical intraepithelial neoplasia, contrast-induced nephropathy
CINV	Chemotherapy-induced nausea and vomiting
Circ	circumcision circulation
CIS	carcinoma in situ
CIVI	continuous intravenous infusion
CIWA	Clinical Institute Withdrawal Assessment for Alcohol
CJD	Creutzfeldt–Jakob disease
CK	creatine kinase (formerly CPK)
CKD	chronic kidney disease
CKMB	MB isoenzyme of creatine kinase
Cl	chlorine clearance
CLABSI	central line-associated bloodstream infections, see central venous catheter
CLARE	contact lens acute red eye
CLL	chronic lymphocytic leukemia
CLN	cervical lymph node
CLND	cervical lymph node dissection complete lymph node dissection
CLP	cleft lip and palate
CLS	capillary leak syndrome
CM	Chirurgiae Magister, Master of Surgery (British and Commonwealth countries medical degree); Caucasian male cardiomyopathy
CMD	cystic medial degeneration
CME	continuing medical education
CML	chronic myelogenous leukemia, also called chronic myeloid leukaemia
CMML	chronic myelomonocytic leukemia
CMO	comfort measures only (palliative care or hospice)
CMP	complete metabolic profile (a blood panel) cytosine monophosphate
CMS	Centers for Medicare and Medicaid Services chronic mountain sickness
CMT	cervical motion tenderness Charcot–Marie–Tooth disease
CMV	cytomegalovirus
CN	cranial nerves
CNS	central nervous system Clinical nurse specialist Crigler–Najjar syndrome
CNVM	Choroidal Neovascular Membranes
C/O or c/o	complains of...
CO	cardiac output carbon monoxide complains of...
CoA	coarctation of the aorta
COAD	chronic obstructive airways disease
COCP	combined oral contraceptive pill
COH	controlled ovarian hyperstimulation
COLD	chronic obstructive lung disease
Comp	compound
Conj	conjunctiva
CoNS	coagulase-negative staphylcocci
COP	cryptogenic organizing pneumonitis
COPD	chronic obstructive pulmonary disease
CO_{2}	carbon dioxide
COVID	coronavirus disease
COX-1	cyclooxygenase 1
COX-2	cyclooxygenase 2
COX-3	cyclooxygenase 3
CP	cerebral palsy chest pain constrictive pericarditis
CPAM	congenital pulmonary airway malformation
CPAP	continuous positive airway pressure
CPC	clinical–pathological conference
CPCR	cardiopulmonary-cerebral resuscitation, a version of CPR
CPD	cephalopelvic disproportion
CPE	Clostridium perfringens enterotoxin cardiogenic pulmonary edema Carbapenemase producing Enterobacteriaceae
CPG	clinical practice guideline
CPK	creatine phosphokinase
CPKMB	creatine phosphokinase heart
CPP	cerebral perfusion pressure
CPPD	calcium pyrophosphate cyclic perimenstrual pain and discomfort (premenstrual syndrome)
CPR	cardiopulmonary resuscitation
CPT	Current Procedural Terminology
CR	complete remission (complete response) controlled release
Cr	creatinine
CRC	colorectal cancer
CrCl	creatinine clearance (Note: Looks similar to, but does not mean, the chromium chlorides—CrCl_{2}, CrCl_{3}, CrCl_{4})
CRD	chronic renal disease circadian rhythm disorder
CRE	carbapenem-resistant Enterobacteriaceae
Creat	creatinine
CREST	calcinosis, Raynaud esophagus, sclerosis, teleangiectasiae
CRF	chronic renal failure corticotropin-releasing factor
CrGN	crescentic glomerulonephritis
CRH	corticotropin-releasing hormone
CRI	chronic renal insufficiency
Crike	Cricothyrotomy
CRISPR	clustered regularly interspaced short palindromic repeats
Crit	hematocrit
CRL	crown-rump length
CRNA	certified registered nurse anesthetist
CRO	contract research organization
CRP	C-reactive protein
CRPC	castration-resistant prostate cancer
CRPS	complex regional pain syndrome
CRRT	continuous renal replacement therapy
CRS	congenital rubella syndrome
CRSD	circadian rhythm sleep disorder
CRT	cardiac resynchronization therapy (artificial pacemaker) chemoradiotherapy conformal radiotherapy (irradiated zone conforms to boundaries) cathode-ray tube capillary refill time central retinal thickness certified respiratory therapist
CRTx	chemoradiotherapy
CS	caesarean section compartment syndrome culture sensitivity Churg–Strauss syndrome
C/S	Caesarean section
C&S	culture and sensitivity (antibiogram)
CsA	cyclosporin A
CSA	Controlled Substances Act
C-section	cesarean section
CSF	cerebrospinal fluid colony-stimulating factor
CSME	clinically significant macular edema
CSOM	chronic suppurative otitis media
CSP	cavum septi pellucidi
CSPC	community specialist palliative care
C-spine	cervical spine
CSR	cumulative survival rate
C-SSRS	Columbia Suicide Severity Rating Scale
CSU	catheter specimen of urine
CST	contraction stress test
CT	computed tomography cervicothoracic
CTA	clear to auscultation computed tomography angiography
CTAB	clear to auscultation bilaterally; also written CTA B
CTAP	CT of the abdomen and pelvis
CTAP	CT during arterial portography
CTCAE	Common Terminology Criteria for Adverse Events
CT c/a/p	CT scan of chest, abdomen, and pelvis
CTD	connective tissue disease
CTE	chronic traumatic encephalopathy coefficient of thermal expansion
CTEPH	Chronic thromboembolic pulmonary hypertension
CTEV	congenital talipes equinovarus
CTO	chronic total occlusion Community Treatment Order (psychiatric term for forced drugging outside hospital context)
CTP	cytosine triphosphate cytidine triphosphate Child–Turcotte–Pugh score clear to percussion
CTPA	computed tomographic pulmonary angiography
CTPE	CT scan for pulmonary embolii
CTR	carpal tunnel release
CTS	computed tomography scan carpal tunnel syndrome
CTU	cancer treatment unit
CTx	chemotherapy
CTX	ceftriaxone (a third-generation cephalosporin antibiotic) contractions chemotherapy
CTZ	Chemoreceptor trigger zone
CUC	chronic ulcerative colitis
CUP	cancer of unknown primary origin
CV	cardiovascular
CVA	cerebrovascular accident costovertebral angle
CVAD	central venous access device
CVAT	costovertebral angle tenderness
CVC	central venous catheter chronic venous congestion
CVD	cardiovascular disease
CVI	cerebrovascular incident
CVL	central venous line
CVP	central venous pressure
CVS	chorionic villus sampling cardiovascular system Cerebrovascular stroke
CVID	common variable immunodeficiency
CVT	cerebral venous thrombosis
CVVH	continuous veno-venous hemofiltration, a short-term alternative to Hemodialysis
c/w	consistent with
CWP	coal worker's pneumoconiosis
Cx	microbiological culture
Cx	complication
Cx	cervix
CXR	chest x-ray (chest radiograph)
