= CMOS (disambiguation) =

CMOS, or complementary metal–oxide–semiconductor, is a class of integrated circuits.

CMOS may also refer to:

== Technology ==
- Nonvolatile BIOS memory, in a personal computer, historically known as CMOS with a CMOS battery
- CMOS sensor, an active pixel sensor in a digital camera
- Credence Systems (former NASDAQ symbol CMOS), a former semiconductor equipment manufacturer

== Other uses ==
- Canadian Meteorological and Oceanographic Society, a Canadian society dedicated to atmospheric and oceanic sciences
- The Chicago Manual of Style
- CMOs, or occasionally, CMOSContract manufacturing organizations, company with customizable outsourced manufacturing capabilities
- Critical management and organizational studies (CMOS), or more often Critical management studies (CMS) is an academic field that uses social theory to question and critique traditional business, management, and organizational practices.

== See also ==
- CMO (disambiguation)
