= Henri Piet =

French boxer

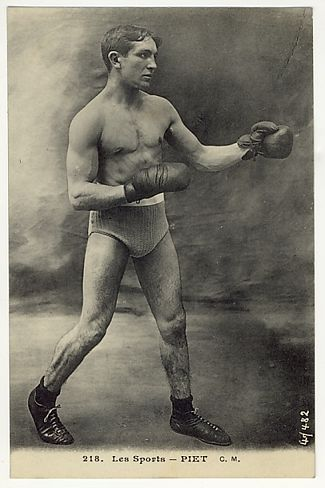

Personal information
- Nationality: French
- Born: Henri Piet; 1 January 1888 Paris, France
- Died: 4 May 1915 (aged 27) Paris, France
- Weight: lightweight

Boxing career

Boxing record
- Total fights: 10
- Wins: 2
- Win by KO: 1
- Losses: 7
- Draws: 1
- No contests: 2

Henri Piet (1 January 1888 – 4 May 1915) was a French Lightweight boxer. He is notable for his EBU lightweight challenge against Freddie Welsh, winning the French welterweight belt in 1912. He died in the boxing ring in 1915, aged 27.

== Boxing career ==
Piet rose to prominence as a lightweight boxer when he challenged Freddie Welsh for the EBU (European) lightweight title. The fight took place at Mountain Ash on 23 August 1909. Piet lasted until the twelfth round when his knee gave way and he retired from the fight. Afterwards Welsh stated that Piet was "The classiest boy I met since I came over, he will trim up a lot of fancied boxers if he goes to the States."
