= Closing capacity =

The closing capacity (CC) is the volume in the lungs at which its smallest airways, the respiratory bronchioles, collapse. It is defined mathematically as the sum of the closing volume and the residual volume. The alveoli lack supporting cartilage and so depend on other factors to keep them open. The closing capacity is less than the Functional Residual Capacity, the amount of gas that normally remains in the lungs during respiration. This means that there is normally enough air within the lungs to keep these airways open throughout both inhalation and exhalation. As the lungs age, there is a gradual increase in the closing capacity (i.e. The small airways begin to collapse at a higher volume/before expiration is complete). This also occurs with certain disease processes, such as asthma, chronic obstructive pulmonary disease, and pulmonary edema. Any process that increases the CC by increasing the closing volume (CV) can increase an individual's risk of hypoxemia, as the small airways may collapse during exhalation, leading to air trapping and atelectasis.

A mnemonic for factors increasing closing capacity is ACLS-S: Age, Chronic bronchitis, LV failure, Smoking, Surgery. Alternatively, CLOSE: Cigarettes, LV failure, Old age, Surgery, Emphysema (& asthma). Often supine positioning will decrease functional residual capacity (FRC) but has no effect on closing capacity.

== See also ==
- Lung volumes
