= Matty Baldwin =

American boxer

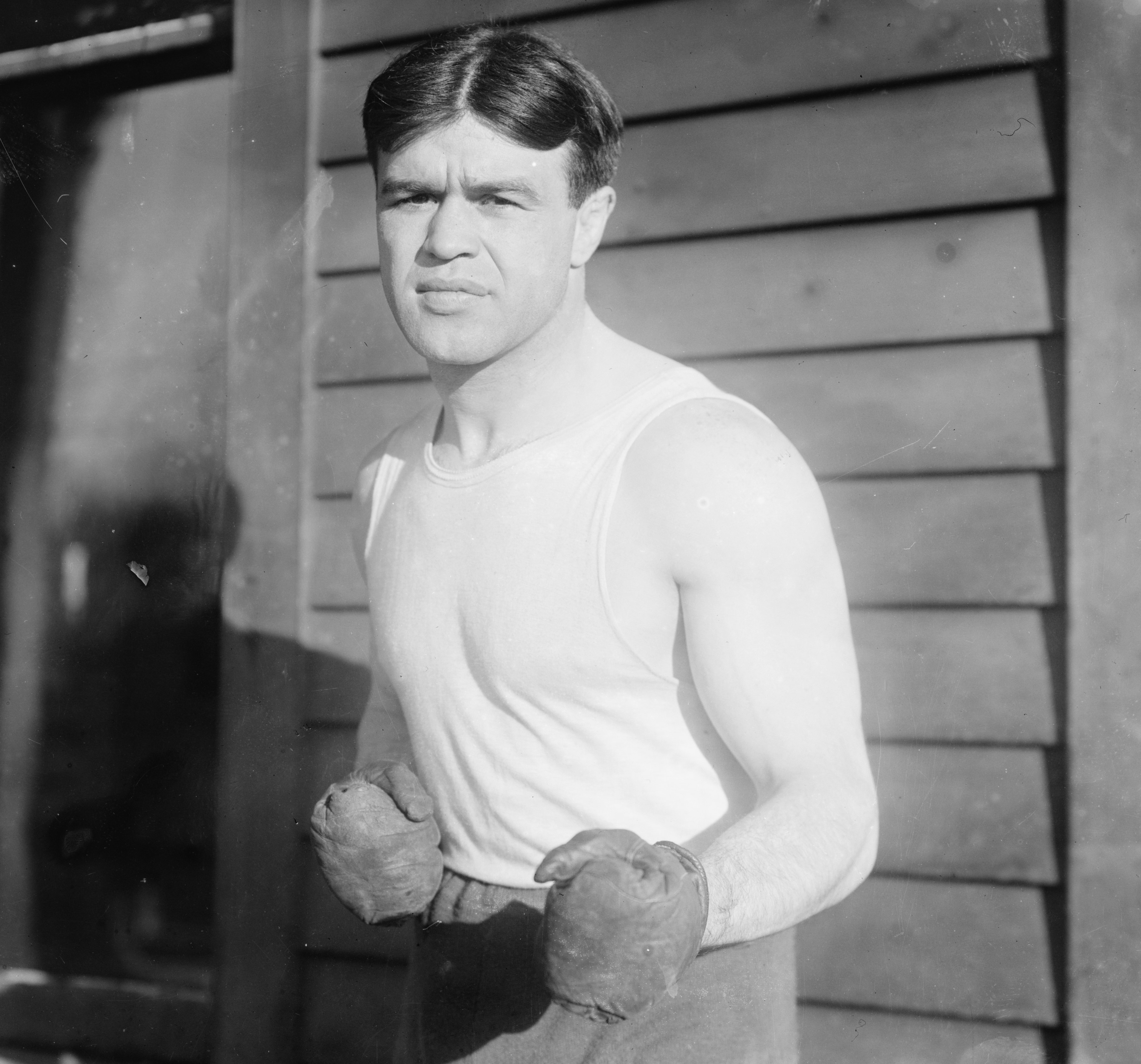

Personal information
- Nickname: Bunker Hill Bearcat
- Nationality: United States
- Born: Matthew M Baldwin; February 15, 1885 Boston, Massachusetts, U.S.
- Died: October 15, 1918 (aged 33)
- Weight: Lightweight

Boxing career
- Stance: Orthodox

Boxing record
- Total fights: 208
- Wins: 101
- Win by KO: 27
- Losses: 39
- Draws: 59
- No contests: 9

Matthew "Matty" Baldwin (February 15, 1885 – October 15, 1918) was an American boxer from Boston, Massachusetts. Baldwin had 208 fights winning 101 of them.

Baldwin fought Johnny Summers in Massachusetts. Baldwin won by decision. Baldwin fought Harlem Tommy Murphy to a draw in Massachusetts. Baldwin fought Jim Driscoll in two consecutive bouts. Driscoll won both fights by decision; in the Bronx, New York and Boston, Massachusetts. Baldwin fought Harlem Tommy Murphy again in Massachusetts. This time, Murphy won by decision. Baldwin fought the great Jack Britton in New York City, New York, but lost by decision. At the end of his career he fought Charley White in Boston, Massachusetts, losing by knockout.
