= Corticosterone 18-monooxygenase =

Class of enzymes

Identifiers
- EC no.: 1.14.15.5
- CAS no.: 37256-75-0

Databases
- IntEnz: IntEnz view
- BRENDA: BRENDA entry
- ExPASy: NiceZyme view
- KEGG: KEGG entry
- MetaCyc: metabolic pathway
- PRIAM: profile
- PDB structures: RCSB PDB PDBe PDBsum
- Gene Ontology: AmiGO / QuickGO
Search
- PMC: articles
- PubMed: articles
- NCBI: proteins

Corticosterone 18-monooxygenase (EC 1.14.15.5) is an enzyme that catalyzes the chemical reaction

Corticosterone
+ 2 reduced
ferredoxin + H^{+}
O_{2}
H_{2}O
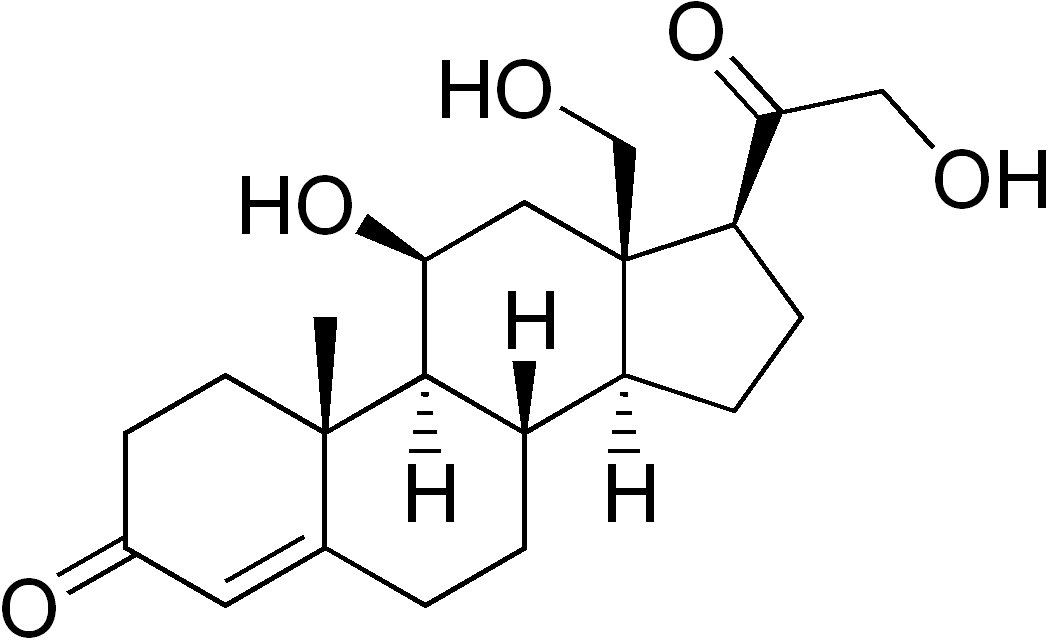
18-Hydroxycorticosterone
+ 2 oxidised
ferredoxin

Corticosterone is an oxidoreductase which uses molecular oxygen to insert a hydroxy group at position 18 of the steroid. It requires adrenal ferredoxin to transfer electrons to the cytochrome P450 active site. The systematic name of this enzyme class is corticosterone,reduced-adrenal-ferredoxin:oxygen oxidoreductase (18-hydroxylating). Other names in common use include corticosterone 18-hydroxylase, and corticosterone methyl oxidase. This enzyme is part of the pathway which converts corticosterone to aldosterone.
