= Costovertebral angle =

Angle formed between twelfth rib and vertebral column

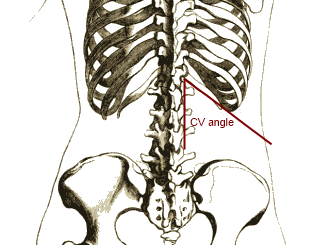
- View of the human skeleton from the back; the costovertebral angle is marked.

Details

Identifiers
- Latin: arcus costovertebralis

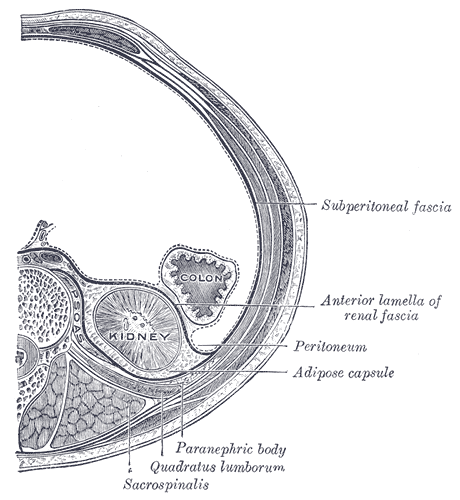
Transverse section, showing the relations of the capsule of the kidney.

The costovertebral angle (Latin: arcus costovertebralis) is the acute angle formed on either side of the human back between the twelfth rib and the vertebral column.

The kidney lies directly below this area, so is the place where, with percussion (Latin: sucussio renalis), pain is elicited when the person has kidney inflammation. The presence of pain is marked as a positive Murphy's punch sign or as costovertebral angle tenderness.
