= Costovertebral angle tenderness =

Type of pain on the spine

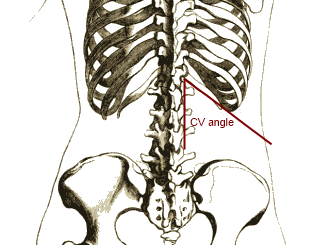
- Anatomic relationship of the 12th rib and lumbar vertebrae with lines representing the CVA overdrawn

Costovertebral angle (CVA) tenderness is pain that results from touching the region inside of the costovertebral angle. The CVA is formed by the 12th rib and the spine. Assessing for CVA tenderness is part of the abdominal exam, and CVA tenderness often indicates kidney pathology.

== Anatomy ==
The CVA is an anatomic concept of the relationship of the 12th rib to the transverse processes of the lumbar vertebrae. There is one CVA on each side of the spine. The lateral part of the CVA is formed by the lower border of the 12th rib, and the medial part of the CVA is formed by the transverse processes of the lumbar vertebrae. The CVA is distinct from the costovertebral joints.

The lower poles of the kidneys are within the CVAs. A small amount of pleura extends below the ribs in the CVAs.

== Physical exam ==
To test for CVA tenderness, the examiner first applies gentle pressure to the region inside of the CVA with their finger. If gentle pressure does not elicit tenderness, the examiner places one hand over the region inside the CVA and taps that hand gently with the closed fist of the other hand.

== Differential diagnosis ==
CVA tenderness often indicates kidney pathology, but it may result from other medical problems. CVA tenderness is often present in acute pyelonephritis. CVA tenderness may be present in patients who have a kidney stone, a stone in the ureter, a ureteropelvic junction obstruction, a kidney abscess, a urinary tract infection, and vesicoureteral reflux. CVA tenderness is also present in patients who have retrocecal appendicitis and retroperitoneal abscesses. In patients with sickle cell disease, blockage of blood flow to the kidney may cause CVA tenderness.

A lack of CVA tenderness in patients with low back pain supports a diagnosis other than kidney pathology.

== History ==
This medical test was first described by the American surgeon John Benjamin Murphy in 1884.

In the Post-Soviet states and Eastern Europe it is often called Pasternacki's sign after Belarusian internist Fiodor Ignatjevich Pasternacki, who described it during his rounds in a regional hospital in Minsk in 1888.

In Italian the manouvre is referred to as "Giordano's sign", after the Italian physician Davide Giordano.

In Poland, it is often called Goldflam's sign after Polish neurologist Samuel Goldflam, who described it in 1900.
