= Summer (disambiguation) =

Summer is one of the four seasons.

Summer or The Summer may also refer to:

== Film ==
- Summer (1930 film), an animated cartoon by Ub Iwerks
- Summer (1976 film), an Estonian-Russian film by Arvo Kruusement
- Summer (1986 film) or The Green Ray, a film by Eric Rohmer
- Summer (2008 film), an independent UK film by Kenny Glenaan
- Summer (2011 film), a Chilean film by José Luis Torres Leiva
- Summer (2018 film), a Russian film

== Literature ==
- "Summer" (poem), a 14th-century poem by Dafydd ap Gwilym
- Summer (Wharton novel), a 1917 novel by Edith Wharton
- Summer, a 2020 novel by Ali Smith
- Summer (L'Été), a 1954 essay by Albert Camus

== Music ==
=== Classical compositions ===
- "Summer" ("L'estate"), the second concerto in Vivaldi's The Four Seasons, 1725

=== Albums ===
- Summer (George Winston album), 1991
- Summer (Harisu album), 2006
- Summer (Summer Watson album), 2003
- Summer, by Zhou Xun, 2003
- Summer 2002, Vol. 1 and 2, a 2022 double album by Moka Only

=== EPs ===
- Summer (Boyfriend EP) or the title song, 2017
- Summer (Cassadee Pope EP) or the title song (see below), 2016
- Summer (Jon Foreman EP), 2008
- Summer (Subtle EP), 2001
- Summer (Tohoshinki single), 2007
- Summer EP (Sherwood EP), 2006
- Sum(me:r), by Pentagon, or the title song, 2019
- The Summer (EP), by Never Shout Never, 2009
- Summer, by Hawk Nelson, 2009

=== Songs ===
- "Summer" (Calvin Harris song), 2014
- "Summer" (Cassadee Pope song), 2016
- "Summer" (Dragon song), 1989
- "Summer" (Good Kid song), 2024
- "Summer" (Mogwai composition), 1996
- "Summer" (Shy Child song), 2007
- "Summer" (War song), 1976
- "Summer (The First Time)", by Bobby Goldsboro, 1973
- "The Summer" (ATB song), 2000
- "The Summer" (Josh Pyke song), 2009
- "Summer", by Alexandra Burke from The Truth Is, 2018
- "Summer", by Alien Ant Farm from Anthology, 2001
- "Summer", by Angel Olsen from All Mirrors, 2019
- "Summer", by Beatsteaks from Living Targets, 2002
- "Summer", by Brockhampton from Saturation II, 2017
- "Summer", by the Carters from Everything Is Love, 2018
- "Summer", by Charlotte Hatherley from Grey Will Fade, 2004
- "Summer", by Courteeners from Concrete Love, 2014
- "Summer", by Dido from Safe Trip Home, 2008
- "Summer", by Emeli Sandé from Let's Say for Instance, 2022
- "Summer", by Fireworks from Gospel, 2011
- "Summer", by Imagine Dragons from Smoke + Mirrors, 2015
- "Summer", by Joe Hisaishi from the soundtrack of the film Kikujiro, 1999
- "Summer", by Kesha from High Road, 2020
- "Summer!", by King Gizzard and the Lizard Wizard from Teenage Gizzard, 2020
- "Summer", by Marsheaux from Lumineux Noir, 2009
- "Summer", by Marshmello from Joytime, 2016
- "Summer", by Moby from the single "Porcelain", 2000
- "Summer", by Modest Mouse from The Fruit That Ate Itself, 1997
- "Summer", by Modestep, 2017
- "Summer", by Parah Dice, 2019
- "Summer", by Smashing Pumpkins from the single "Perfect", 1998
- "Summer", by Sum 41 from Half Hour of Power, 2000
- "Summer!", by twlv, Superbee, Uneducated Kid, and Yuzion, 2020
- "Summer", by W&W with Jochen Miller, 2012
- "Summer", by XO-IQ from the television series Make It Pop, 2016

== Paintings ==
- Summer (Claus), an 1893 painting by Emile Claus
- Summer (Goya), a 1786–87 painting by Francisco de Goya
- Summer (Arcimboldo), a 1572 painting by Giuseppe Arcimboldo

== Video games ==
- _Summer (visual novel), by Hooksoft (2005)
- "Summer", a story arc in the visual novel Air (2000)

== Companies ==
- The Summer Company, an American theatre company based in Pittsburgh
- Virgil C. Summer Nuclear Generating Station, a facility in South Carolina, USA

== People ==
- Summer (given name), an English feminine first name, including a list of people with the name
- Summer (surname), a family name, including a list of people with the name
- Summer XO (born 1982), American singer and visual artist known as Summer before 2013

== Other uses ==
- Adder (electronics) or summer, a circuit that sums numbers
- Bressummer or summer, a beam used in building construction
- Season of Summer (liturgy), a period in the East Syriac liturgical year

== See also ==
- Category:Summer
- Sommer (means 'summer' in some Germanic languages), a surname
- Sumer, an ancient civilisation in Mesopotamia
- Summerland (disambiguation)
- Summers (disambiguation)
- Summertime (disambiguation)
- Sumner (disambiguation)
