= Summers (disambiguation) =

Summers are one of the four seasons.

Summers may also refer to:

== People ==
- Summers (surname)

== Places ==
- Summers, Arkansas
- Summers, West Virginia, in Doddridge County
- Summers County, West Virginia

== Other ==
- Summers (comedy duo), a Japanese comedy duo

== See also ==
- Summer (disambiguation)
- Somers (disambiguation)
- Justice Summers (disambiguation)
