= Summar =

Summar is a surname. Notable people with the surname include:

- Marshall Summar (born 1959), American physician, clinical geneticist, and academic
- Trent Summar, American country music singer, member of Trent Summar & the New Row Mob

== See also ==
- Summer (surname)
