= Summer (given name) =

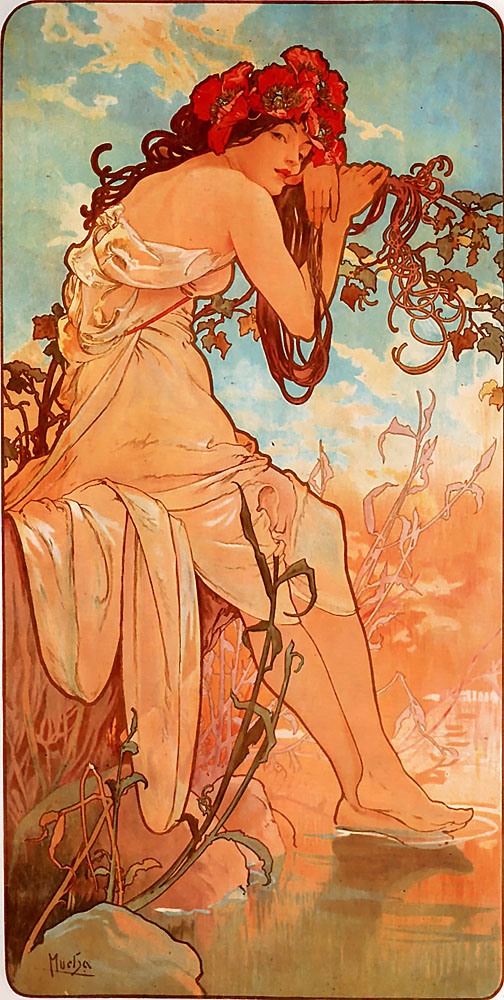
- Summer, personification by Alfons Mucha, 1896
- Pronunciation: Sum-mer
- Gender: Female

Origin
- Origin: Old English
- Meaning: "summer"
- Region of origin: English-speaking countries

Summer is an English feminine given name of recent coinage derived from the word for the season of summer, the warmest season of the year and a time people generally associate with carefree and fun activities. It has been in common use as a name since at least 1970 in English-speaking countries. Summer, along with other seasonal and nature names, came into fashion as part of the 1960s and 70s counterculture.

The name has ranked among the top 100 names for girls in recent years in Scotland, England, Wales, New Zealand, and Australia. It has ranked among the top 300 names for girls in the United States since 1970 and was the 648th most common name for girls and women in the United States in the 1990 census. It was the 141st most popular name for American girls born in the United States in 2021.

It could also be a variant of the Arabic name Samar meaning an evening conversation.

== Notable people ==
- Summer Altice (born December 1979), American model
- Summer Bishil (born 1988), American actress
- Summer Bartholomew (born 1951), winner of the 1975 Miss USA pageant
- Summer Cem (born 1983), German rapper of Turkish descent
- Summer Edward (born 1986), Trinidadian-American writer, children's editor, educator, literary activist, and literature specialist
- Summer Erb (born 1977), American basketball player
- Summer Glau (born 1981), American actress
- Summer H. Howell (born 2004), Canadian actress
- Summer Lee (born 1987), American lawyer, community organizer, and Pennsylvania's Democratic representative
- Summer Lochowicz (born 1978), Australian volleyball player
- Summer McIntosh (born 2006), Canadian Olympic swimmer & world record holder in women's 400 metre long course freestyle and medley events.
- Summer Meng (born 1991), Taiwanese actress
- Summer Moak (born 1999), American racing cyclist
- Summer Mortimer (born 1993), former Canadian-Dutch paraswimmer
- Summer Phoenix (born 1978), American actress
- Summer Rae (born 1983), American wrestler
- Summer Rayne Oakes (born 1984), American fashion model, environmental activist, author, and entrepreneur
- Summer Ross (born 1992), American beach volleyball player
- Summer Sanders (born 1972), American swimmer and sports commentator
- Summer Schmit (born 2003), American Paralympic swimmer
- Summer Stephan, District Attorney for the County of San Diego
- Summer Strallen (born 1985), English actress and musical theatre performer
- Summer Watson (born 1977), British opera singer
- Summer XO (born 1982), American singer
- Summer Walker (born 1996), American singer

== Fictional characters ==
- Cure Summer, protagonist of Tropical-Rouge! Pretty Cure
- Summer Dawson, from the novel Wonder
- Summer Finn, from 500 Days of Summer
- Summer Gleeson, from Batman: The Animated Series
- Summer Hathaway, a character in School of Rock
- Summer Hartley, from Definitely, Maybe
- Summer Holiday from The Sims 4
- Summer Hoyland, from Neighbours
- Summer Hugglemonster, from Henry Hugglemonster
- Summer Jones, a.k.a. Wonder, from the film Zoom
- Summer Moran, from Dirk Pitt
- Summer Newman, a character from the American soap opera The Young and the Restless
- Roberta "Summer" Quinn, a character in the American action drama TV series Baywatch
- Summer Roberts, from The O.C.
- Summer Shaw, from Hollyoaks
- Summer Wheatley, from Napoleon Dynamite
- Summer, minor character in Futari wa Pretty Cure (originally named Natsuko Koshino)
- Summer Penguin, from the 2018 revival of Muppet Babies
- Summer, a character from the 2020 video game Spiritfarer

== See also ==
- Autumn (given name)
- Summer (surname)
- Summer (disambiguation)
