= Simmers =

Simmers is an English language surname and a patronymic from Summer. Notable people with the name include:

- Bren Simmers (1976), Canadian poet
- Brian Simmers (1940), former Scotland international rugby union player
- Chris Simmers (1969), Scottish former rugby union player
- Max Simmers (1904–1972), Scottish rugby union player
- Tertuis Simmers (1983), South African politician
- William Simmers (footballer) (1865–1950), Scottish footballer
