= Summertime =

Summertime may refer to:

== Seasons and time of day ==
- Summer, one of the temperate seasons
- Daylight saving time or summer time, advancing the clock one hour during the summer
  - British Summer Time
  - Western European Summer Time
  - Central European Summer Time
  - Eastern European Summer Time

== Arts, entertainment, and media ==
=== Films ===
- Summertime, a 1935 cartoon by Ub Iwerks
- Summertime (1955 film), a British/American film starring Katharine Hepburn
- Summertime (2001 film), a South Korean film starring Choi Cheol-ho
- Summer Times, a 2009 Taiwanese film starring Bryant Chang and Shara Lin
- Summertime (2015 film), a French drama
- Summertime (2016 film), directed by Gabriele Muccino
- Summertime (2018 film), directed by Edward Burns
- Summertime (2020 film), directed by Carlos López Estrada
- Summer Hours (L'Heure d'été), a French film starring Juliette Binoche

=== Literature ===
- Summertime (novel), 2009, by J. M. Coetzee
- Summertime (1919 play), a comedy work by Louis N. Parker
- Summertime, a 1937 play by Ugo Betti
- Summertime, a 2000 play by Charles L. Mee

=== Music ===
==== Albums ====
- Summertime (Herb Alpert album), 1971
- Summertime (MFSB album), 1976
- Summertime (Paul Desmond album), 1969
- Summertime!, an EP by The Drums, 2005
- Summertime, by Joe Locke and Geoffrey Keezer, 2005
- Summertime, an EP by The Subways
- Summer Time (album), a 2021 album by Roy Wang

==== Songs ====
- "Summertime" (George Gershwin song), from the opera Porgy and Bess
- "Summertime" (Beyoncé song)
- "Summertime" (Bon Jovi song)
- "Summertime" (Brian Melo song)
- "Summertime" (Cinnamons and Evening Cinema song)
- "Summertime" (DJ Jazzy Jeff & The Fresh Prince song)
- "Summertime" (Kenny Chesney song)
- "Summertime" (The Maybes? song)
- "Summertime" (New Kids on the Block song)
- "Summertime" (Selah Sue song)
- "Summertime" (The Sundays song)
- "Summertime" (Wiley song)
- "Summertime", by Another Level from Nexus
- "Summertime", by Aaron Carter from Another Earthquake!
- "Summertime", by Audio Adrenaline from Lift
- "Summertime", by Barenaked Ladies from All in Good Time
- "Summertime", by Bridgit Mendler from the soundtrack for the film Arrietty
- "Summertime", by the Buckinghams
- "Summertime", by the Click Five from Modern Minds and Pastimes
- "Summertime", by Cody Simpson, B-side of the single "iYiYi"
- "Summertime", by Diana Ross from Red Hot Rhythm & Blues
- "Summertime", by the Fire Theft from their self-titled album
- "Summertime", by Gavin DeGraw from Face the River
- "Summertime", by Honeyz from Wonder No.8
- "Summertime", by Kreayshawn from Somethin' 'Bout Kreay
- "Summertime", by Michelle Branch from Everything Comes and Goes
- "Summertime", by Moonpools & Caterpillars from The Baby-Sitters Club: Music from the Motion Picture
- "Summertime", by MNL48
- "Summertime", by Mos Def
- "Summertime", by My Chemical Romance from Danger Days: The True Lives of the Fabulous Killjoys
- "Summertime", by Sam Adams
- "Summertime", by Stromae from Cheese
- "Summertime", by Vince Staples from Summertime '06
- "Summertime, Summertime", a song by the Jamies
- "Summertime Summertime", a song by Corina
- "Summer Time" (song), by James Barker Band
- "Summer Time", by Pretty Things from the reissue of Parachute
- "Doin' Time", by Sublime, a loose cover version of the George Gershwin song, and frequently referred to as "Summertime", 1997
- "Sommartider" ("Summertimes"), a song by Per Gessle

=== Television ===
- Summertime (TV series), an Italian drama web television series distributed by Netflix in 2020
- Summertime '57/'58, a Canadian variety television series
- "Summertime" (Shameless), a 2012 episode

== See also ==
- Summer (disambiguation)
- In the Summertime (disambiguation)
- Summertime Blues (disambiguation)
