= I'm Crazy to Love You =

Single by Sarah Vaughan
- B-side: "Summertime"
- Released: 1950
- Label: Columbia
- Songwriters: Sue Werner; Kay Werner; Larry Marino

"I'm Crazy to Love You" is a song that was a hit in 1950 for Sarah Vaughan, who recorded it for Columbia with the orchestra under the direction of Joe Lipman.

== Composition ==
The song was written by Sue Werner, Kay Werner and Larry Marino.

== Critical reception ==
Professional ratings
Review scores
Source	Rating
Billboard	70/100

Billboard reviewed Vaughan's recording (Columbia 38701, coupled with "Summertime") on 11 February 1950, writing "The thrush again is in top form for a straight reading of a new and pretty flicker title tune. Could be a winner" and rating it 70 ("good").

== Commercial performance ==
Vaughan's single spent several weeks on Billboard's Records Most Played by Disk Jockeys chart, peaking at No. 26 in the issue dated 1 July 1950.

== Charts ==
Chart (1950)	Peak position
US Billboard Records Most Played by Disk Jockeys	26
