= LossLess Records =

American record label

LossLess Records Records
- Founded: 2006
- Founder: Bill Bauman
- Genre: pop, singer-songwriter
- Country of origin: United States
- Location: Philadelphia, Pennsylvania
- Official website: www.losslessrecords.com

LossLess Records is an American record label founded by Bill Bauman in Philadelphia, Pennsylvania in 2006. LossLess Records' founding artist was Summer and they later signed Jeremy Gloff in 2008. LossLess Records tagline is "The Open Source Label," as it is known for being a label whose business philosophy parallels that of the open source community.

== History ==
=== Formation ===
Bill Bauman met Summer and Jeremy Gloff at the Three Friends coffee shop in Portland, OR in 2004. Summer and Golf were songwriter friends from the East Coast who each had an act in the coffeeshop's lineup. The three kept in touch throughout Summer and Jeremy's West Coast tour.

When Summer went to music school in Chicago in 2006, she wrote some new material that she shared with Bauman. Bauman decided to start a label to put out her first full-length album based on this material. The album was called Timing and Lighting and was released in late 2008. Summer also released a 300-piece series of poster-size paintings to accompany the album, a collection she named The Girls. LossLess Records owns the rights to the painting series and, in a surprising move, Summer and LossLess Records chose to give away (via license) the entire series to fans along with a CD purchase. This is the first recorded attempt to license a tangible piece of art.

In 2008, LossLess Records signed Jeremy Gloff and put out his fifteenth album, 1987.

=== Philosophy ===
Much like the open source community, LossLess Records supports technology, innovation, open standards, and evolved licensing practices, drawing on Bauman's technology background. LossLess Records’ website states, "LossLess Records does not sell music. We sell licenses to it. We maintain ownership of any distribution that we produce. This will be true for any product of the arts that LossLess Records creates or provides. This does not mean we are going to take your CD's away from you at some point, it just means that we reserve the right to their license and usage".
