= The Threshing Floor =

Painting by Francisco de Goya

- La trilla (Spanish)
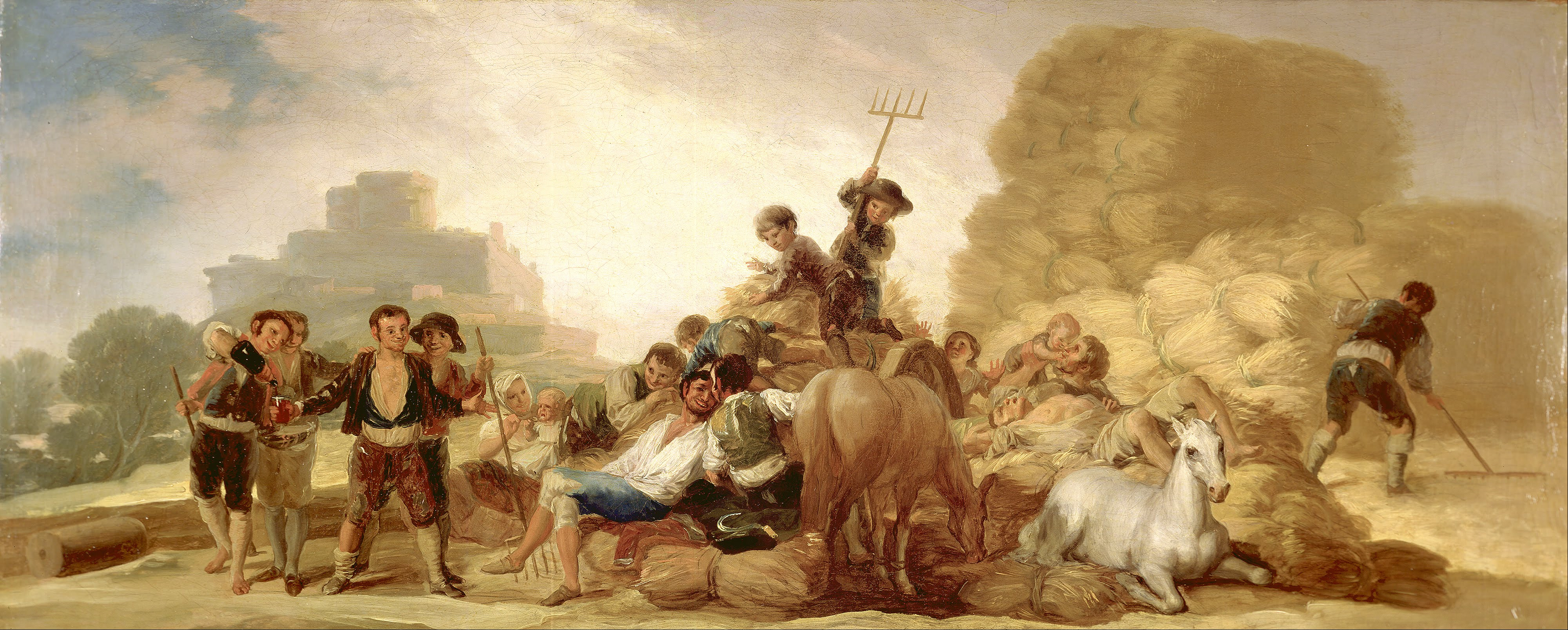
- Artist: Francisco de Goya
- Year: 1786
- Medium: oil on canvas
- Dimensions: 33.5 cm × 79.5 cm (13.2 in × 31.3 in)
- Location: Lázaro Galdiano Museum, Madrid

The Threshing Floor (Spanish - La trilla) is an oil sketch by Francisco Goya. He painted it in 1786 as a small-scale sketch for a tapestry cartoon entitled Summer, part of a set of designs for tapestries for the Royal Palace of El Pardo, specifically the rooms of the Prince of Asturias (the future Charles IV) and his wife Maria Luisa.

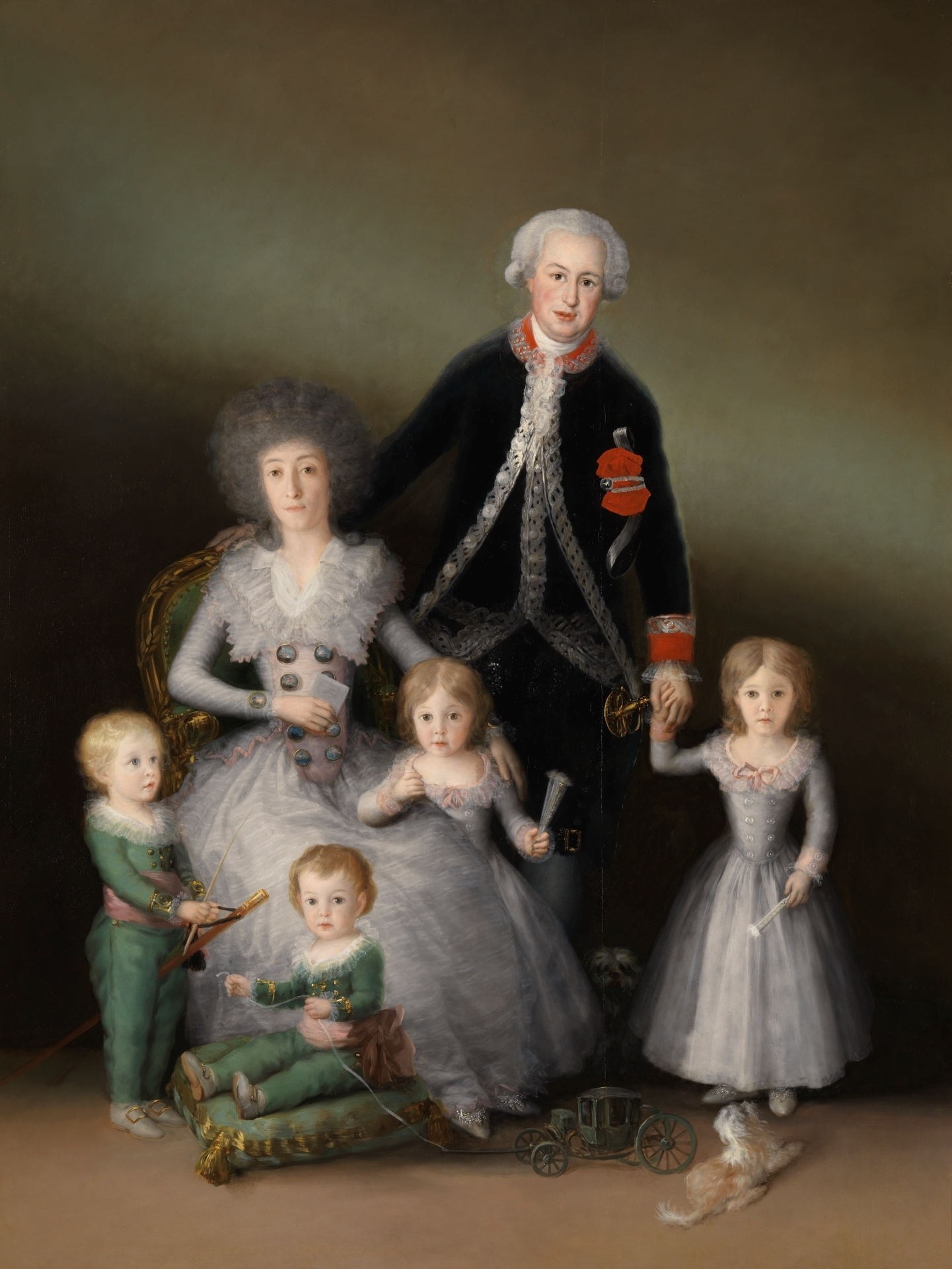
The 9th Duke (1755–1807) and Duchess of Osuna (c. 1754–1834), with their children, c. 1790, portrait by Goya

== History ==
The sketches for the tapestries were presented for royal approval prior to the preparation of the cartoons, but rather than entering the royal collection, La trilla remained in the artist's possession until he sold it and several other works to his patrons the Duke and Duchess of Osuna. They remained in the ducal palace at Alameda de Osuna until their sale to R. Trauman at auction in 1896. They were bought between 1925 and 1927 by the collector José Lázaro Galdiano and remain in the Lázaro Galdiano Museum.

== Description ==
This sketch has a panoramic view based on three groups of people, they represent three different attitudes of peasants resting during the threshing. On the left stands a medieval castle, and four men are mocking a peasant who is seen drinking, echoing 'The Drinker. As he is the center of the entire composition, Goya gives him a white shirt that radiates light.

In the background, children play with a grain cart, and a horse eats peacefully. A burly peasant and a mare rest while another distributes the wheat for the next threshing. One of the women, meanwhile, has noticed the danger to a child – probably her son – and picks him up from the grain cart. Another woman breastfeeds her child.

The palette of warm and gentle tones is a notable legacy of the Rococo, which Goya deeply admired.

== See also ==
- List of works by Francisco Goya
