= Winter (1930 film) =

1930 film by Burt Gillett

- Title card
- Directed by: Burt Gillett
- Produced by: Walt Disney
- Music by: Bert Lewis
- Color process: Black and white
- Production company: Walt Disney Productions
- Distributed by: Columbia Pictures
- Release date: October 30, 1930
- Running time: 6 min
- Country: United States
- Language: English

Winter is a 1930 American animated short film directed by Burt Gillett. It was released on October 30, 1930. It is the fifteenth film in the Silly Symphonies series. It is the fourth and final film in the cycle of season themed Silly Symphonies following Springtime, Summer, and Autumn.

The film

== Plot ==
Winter has come to the forest and the snow is falling. When the wind blows, animals sleep. When the wind stops blowing, the little trees and various animals dance and play. Various animals are ice skating. Some animals dance in duos, while others form large dance groups. When the wind returns, the animals take shelter.

== Reception ==
The Film Daily (December 28, 1930): "This Disney Silly Symphony doesn't stand up with previous releases. The synchrony is well done and the animation up to the average but it lacks gags for laughs. Much snow, skating and sliding, with the usual animal antics for nothing particularly clever."

== Home media ==
The short was released on December 19, 2006, on Walt Disney Treasures: More Silly Symphonies, Volume Two.

The short was released on the Blu-Ray release of Olaf's Frozen Adventure.
