= Summer (Goya) =

Painting by Francisco de Goya

- El verano (Spanish)
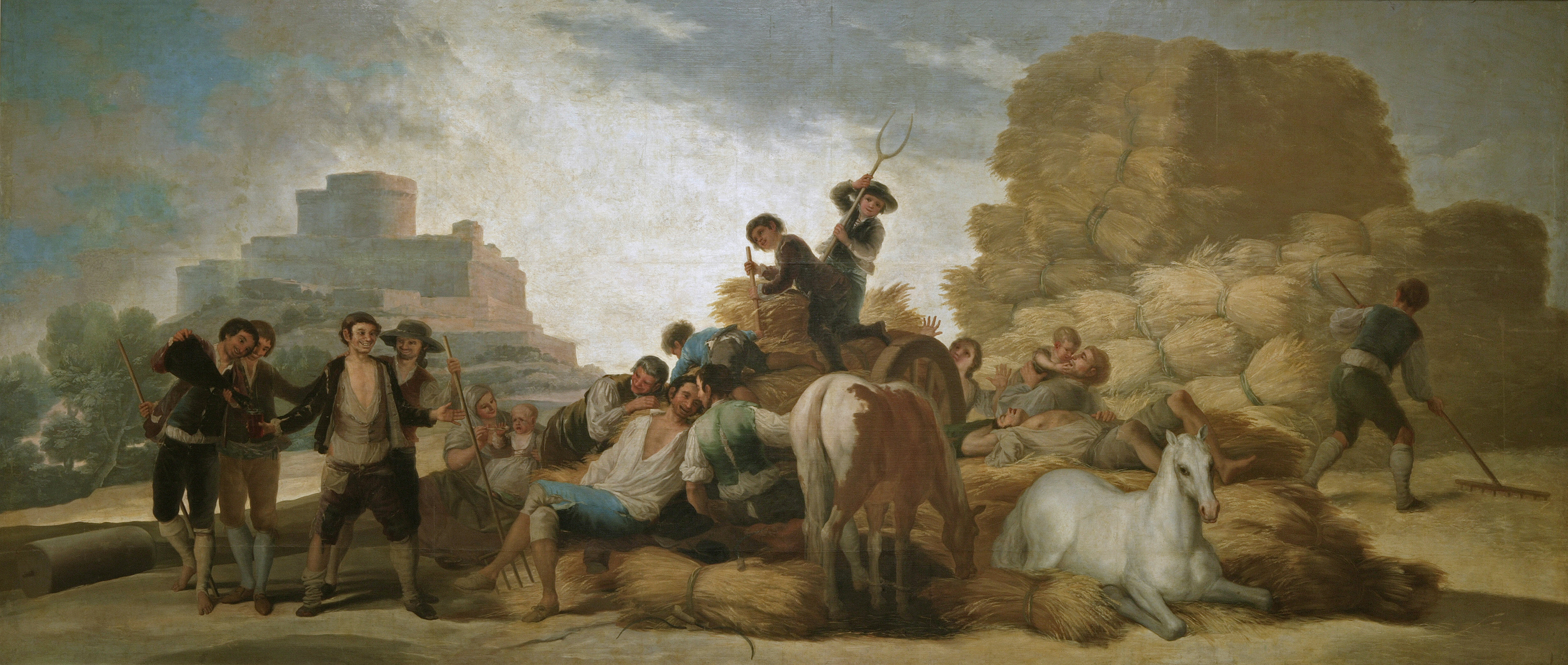
- Artist: Francisco de Goya
- Year: 1786 to 1787
- Catalogue: P000794
- Medium: Oil on Canvas
- Movement: Dark-Romanticism
- Dimensions: 277 cm × 642 cm (109 in × 253 in)
- Location: Museo del Prado, Madrid

Summer (Spanish - El verano) or The Threshing Floor (Spanish - La era) is the largest cartoon painted by Francisco de Goya as a tapestry design for Spain's Royal Tapestry Factory. Painted from 1786 to 1787, it was part of his fifth series, dedicated to traditional themes and intended for the heir to the Spanish throne and his wife (the Prince and Princess of Asturias). The tapestries were to hang in the couple's dining room at the Pardo Palace.

The cartoon is now in the Museo del Prado in Madrid, whilst a smaller sketch for the work known as The Threshing Floor is in the Lázaro Galdiano Museum.

== Description ==
=== Modern analysis ===
In spite of avoiding the traditionally used emblem for summer, the goddess Ceres crowned with wheat ears, Goya was still able to make use of popular symbols for his representation of the season in the largest cartoon tapestry from the Fifth Series. In his pursuit to uniquely depict the season, Goya created a scene of harvesters taking a break from the summer heat by sitting beside or on top of a pile of recently harvested wheat sheafs. Featured to the right of the painting is those whom Goya presents as the ones that continued their laborious work, while on the left side of the painting a group of peasants are portrayed trying to inebriate another character; by the clothing and posture of this character, it can be assumed that Goya was attempting to depict “the village idiot.” Additionally, the artist suggests a feeling of siesta time- commonly known as the short nap taken around midday in Spanish culture- with the portrayal of the men laying down and relaxing on the pile of wheat sheafs.

=== Fifth series of tapestries ===
Apart from being recognized as one of the most important Spanish artists during the late eighteenth and early nineteenth centuries, Francisco José de Goya y Lucientes was also highly associated with the royal workshops of the Spanish monarchy. Beginning in 1774, Goya worked in this setting throughout the rest of his life which covered a span of four ruling monarchies. After being asked by painter Anton Raphael Mengs to work on preliminary paintings for the Royal Tapestry Factory, Goya painted sixty-three large cartoons on commission for Charles III. Within these cartoons, twelve were grouped and named the Fifth Series of Francisco Goya’s Tapestry Cartoons (Fig. 1). Included in this series is Summer (El verano). All the paintings of the fifth series are intended for the dining room of the Prince of Asturias, that is to say of the one who was to become Charles IV and his wife Marie Louise of Parma, in the Pardo Palace. The painting was painted in the fall of 1786. It was considered lost until 1869, when the canvas was discovered in the basement of the Royal Palace of Madrid by Gregorio Cruzada Villaamil, and was returned to the Prado Museum in 1870 by orders of January 19 and February 9, 1870, where it is exhibited in room 943. The canvas is mentioned for the first time in the catalog of the Prado Museum in 1876.

Fig. 1; List of Francisco Goya's tapestry cartoons

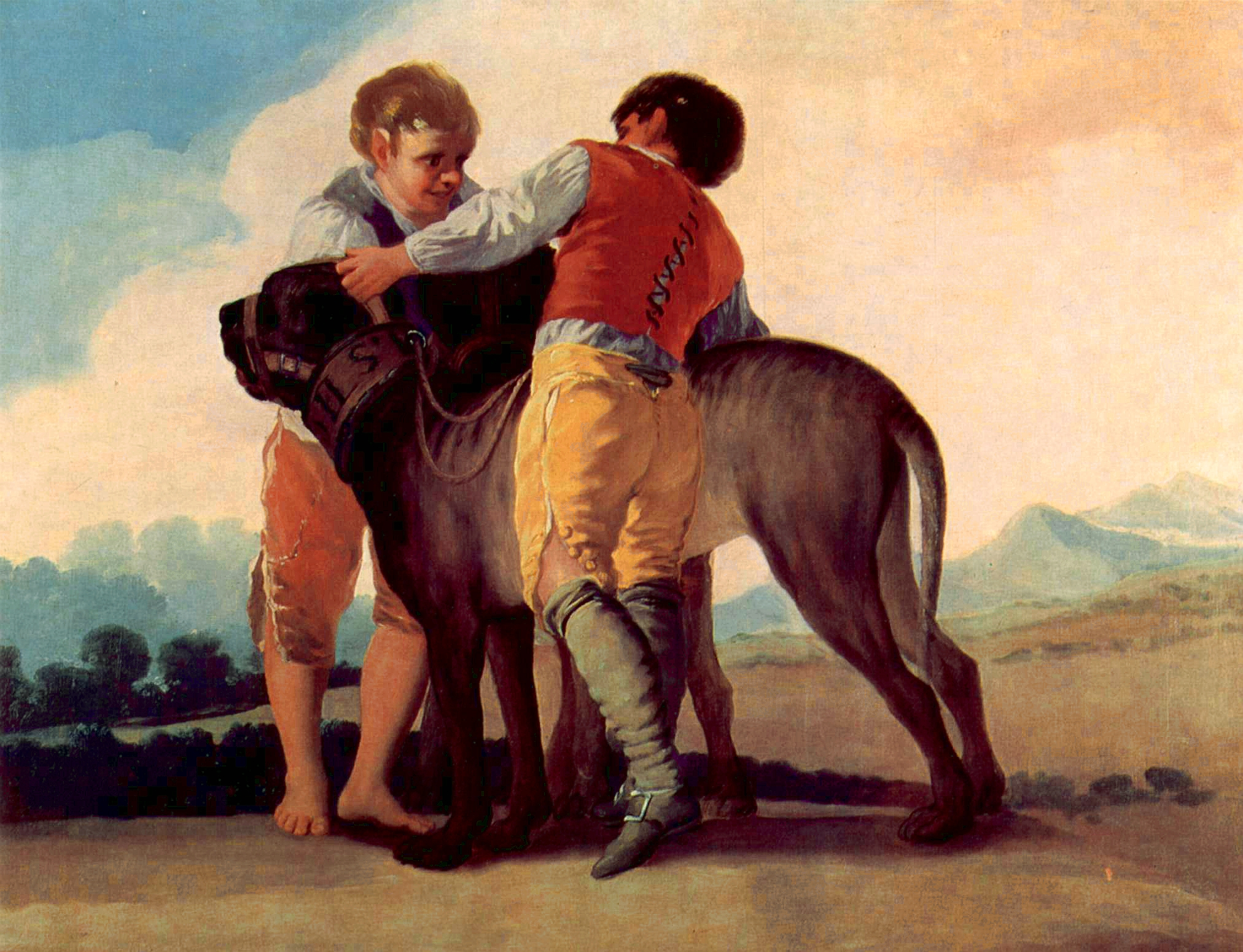
Niños con mastines

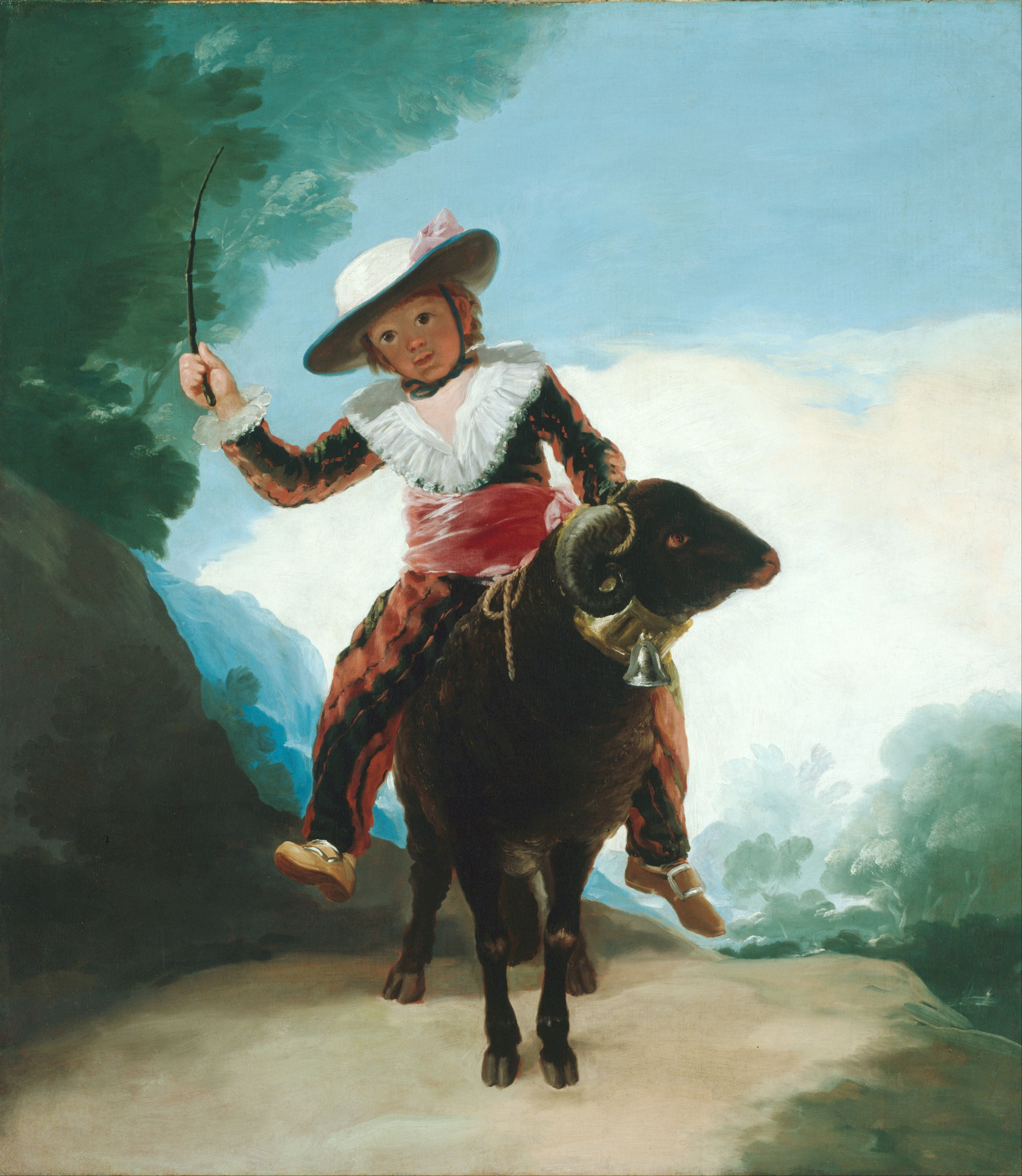
Niño montando un carnero

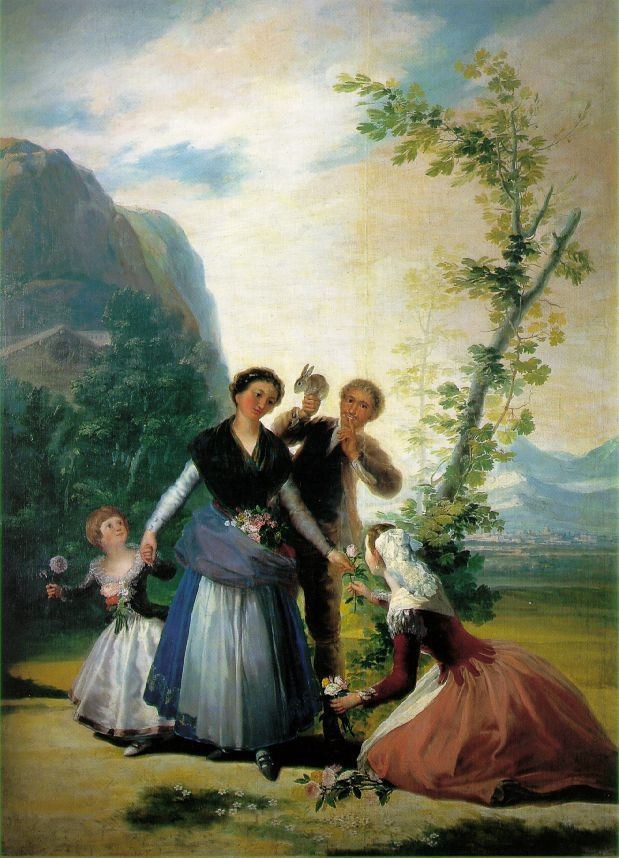
Las floreras

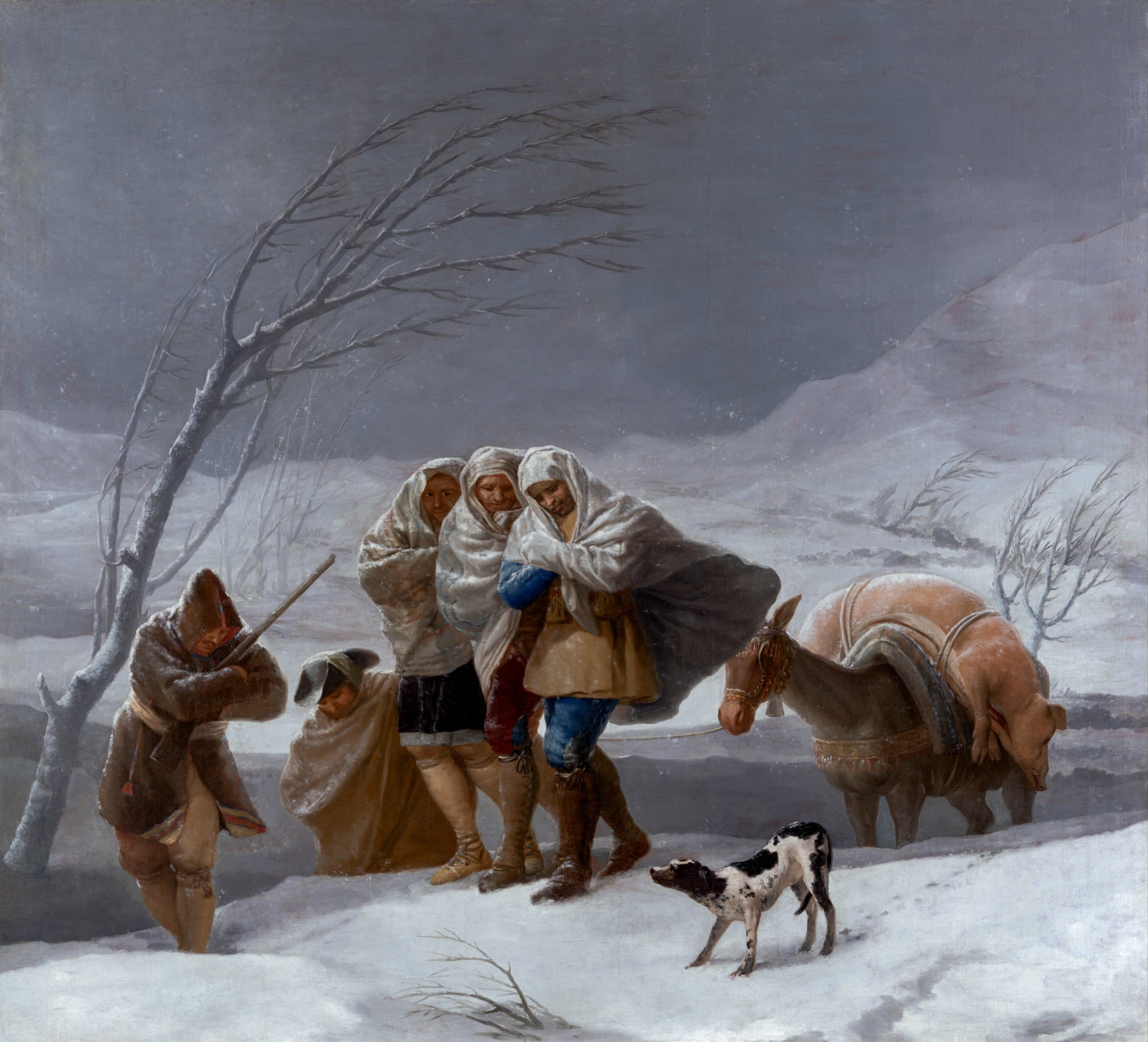
La nevada

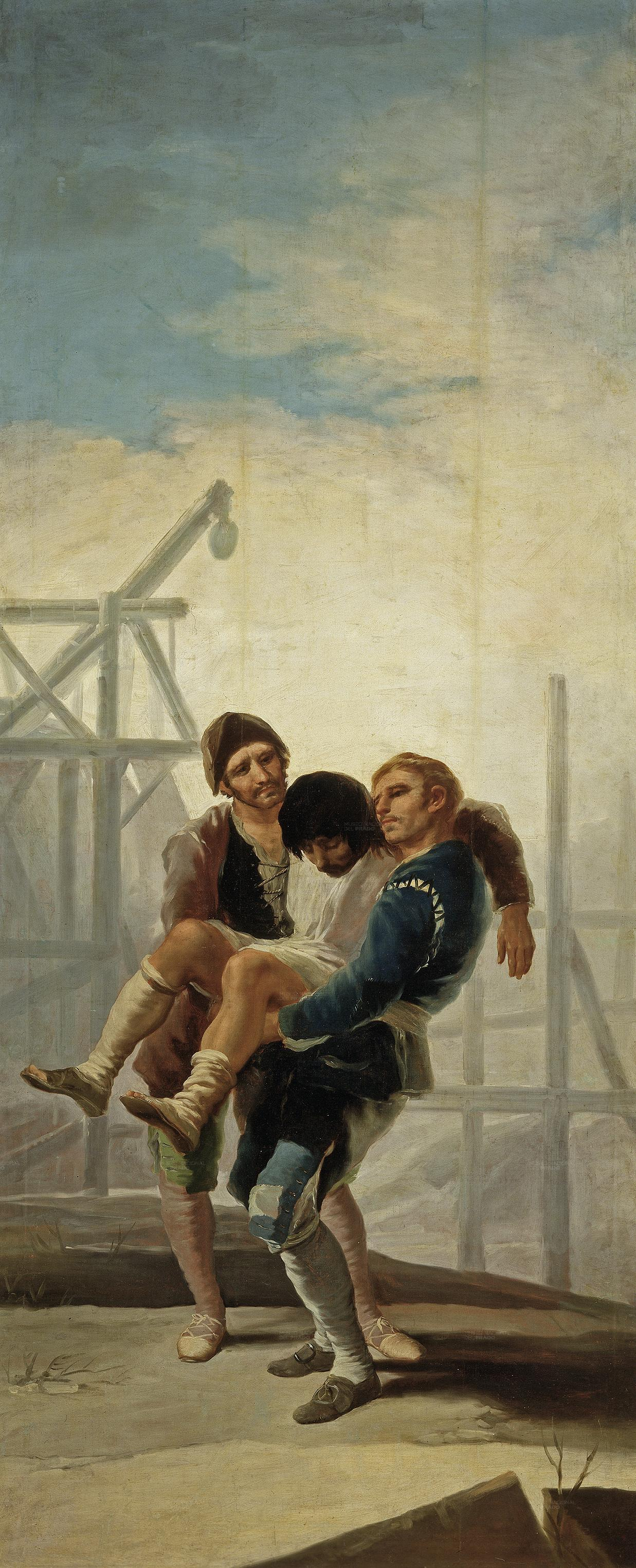
El albañil herido

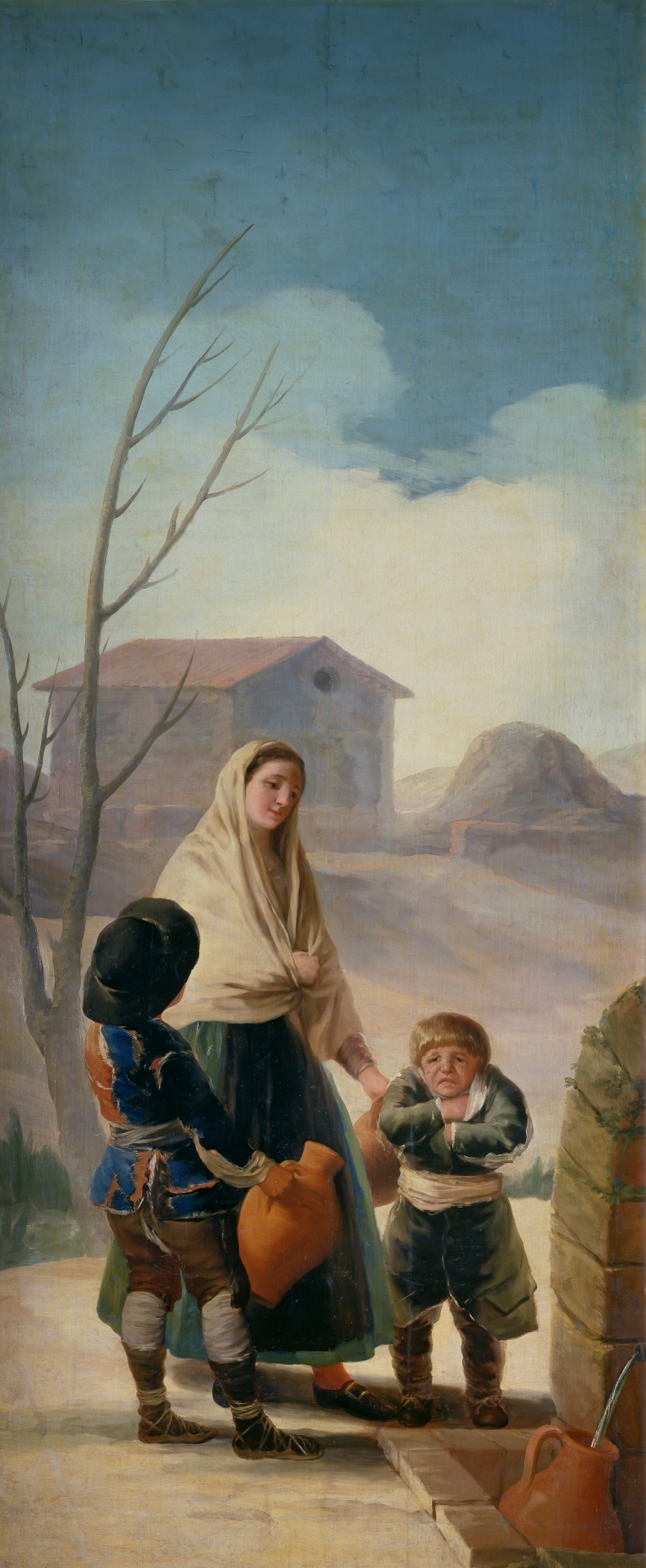
Los pobres en la fuente

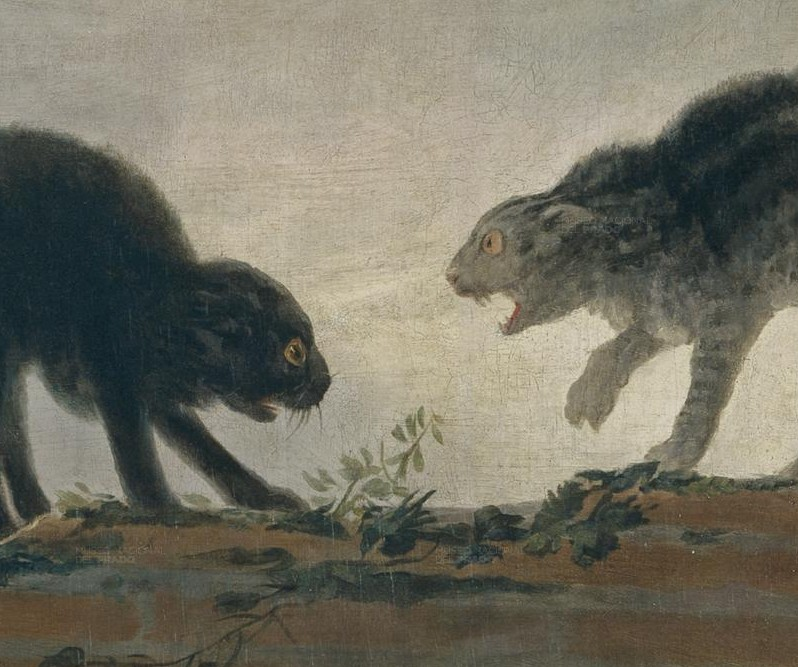
Riña de gatos

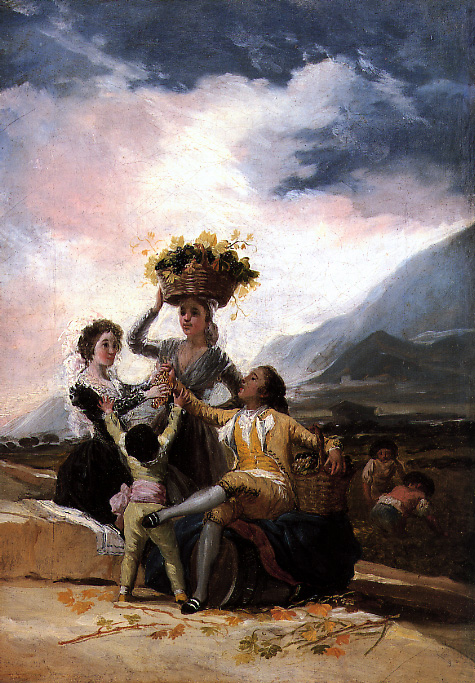
La vendimia

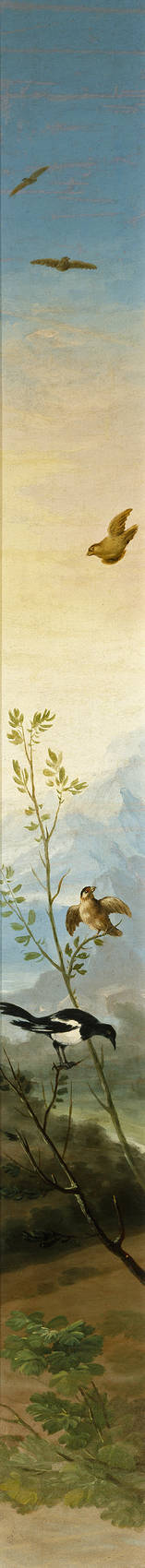
La marica en un árbol

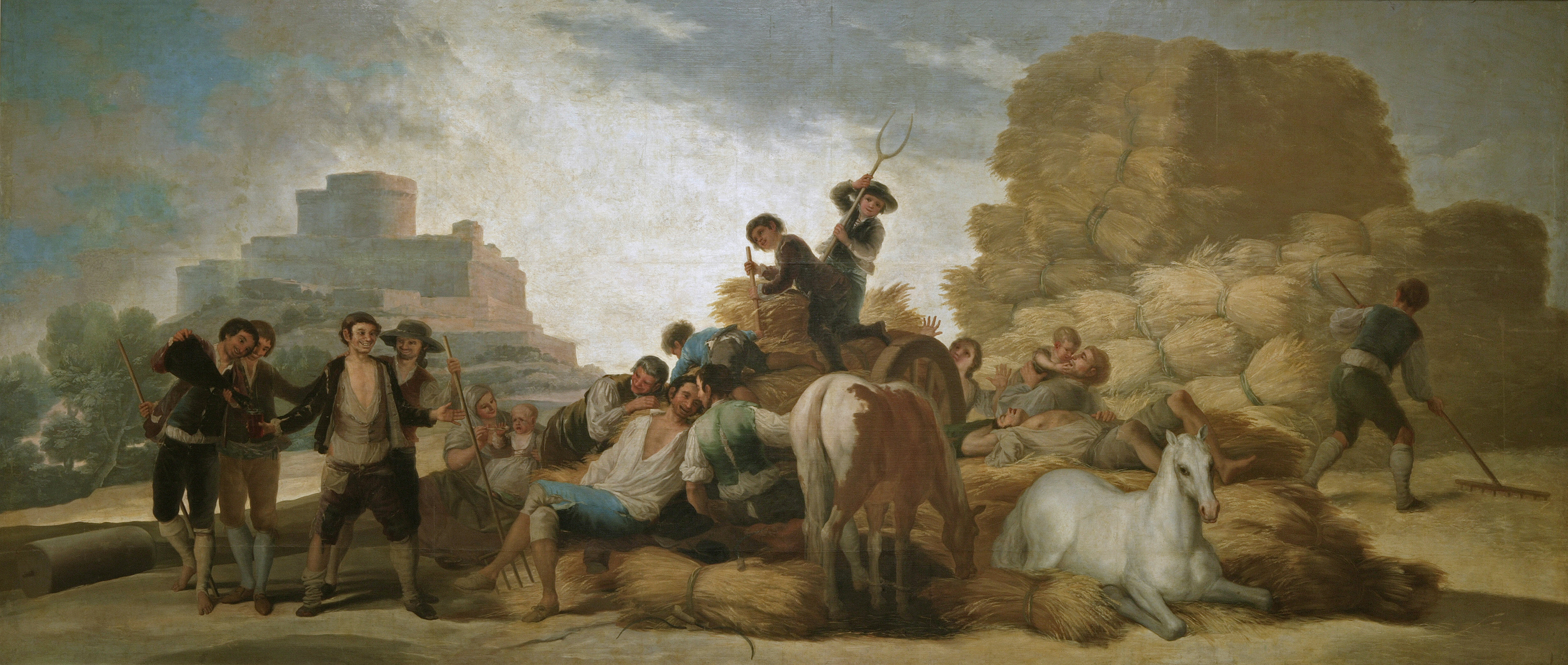
La era

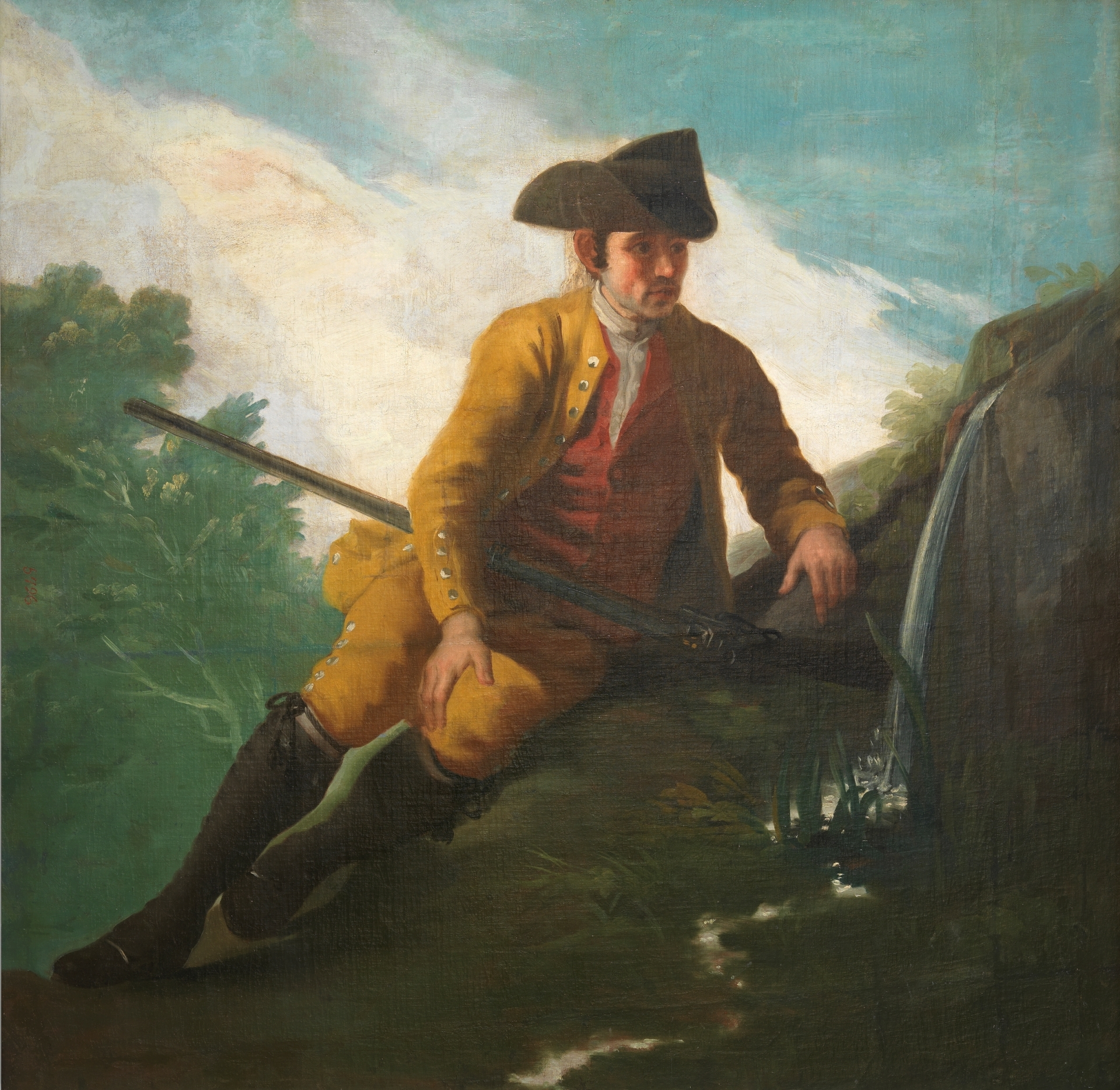
Cazador junto a una fuente

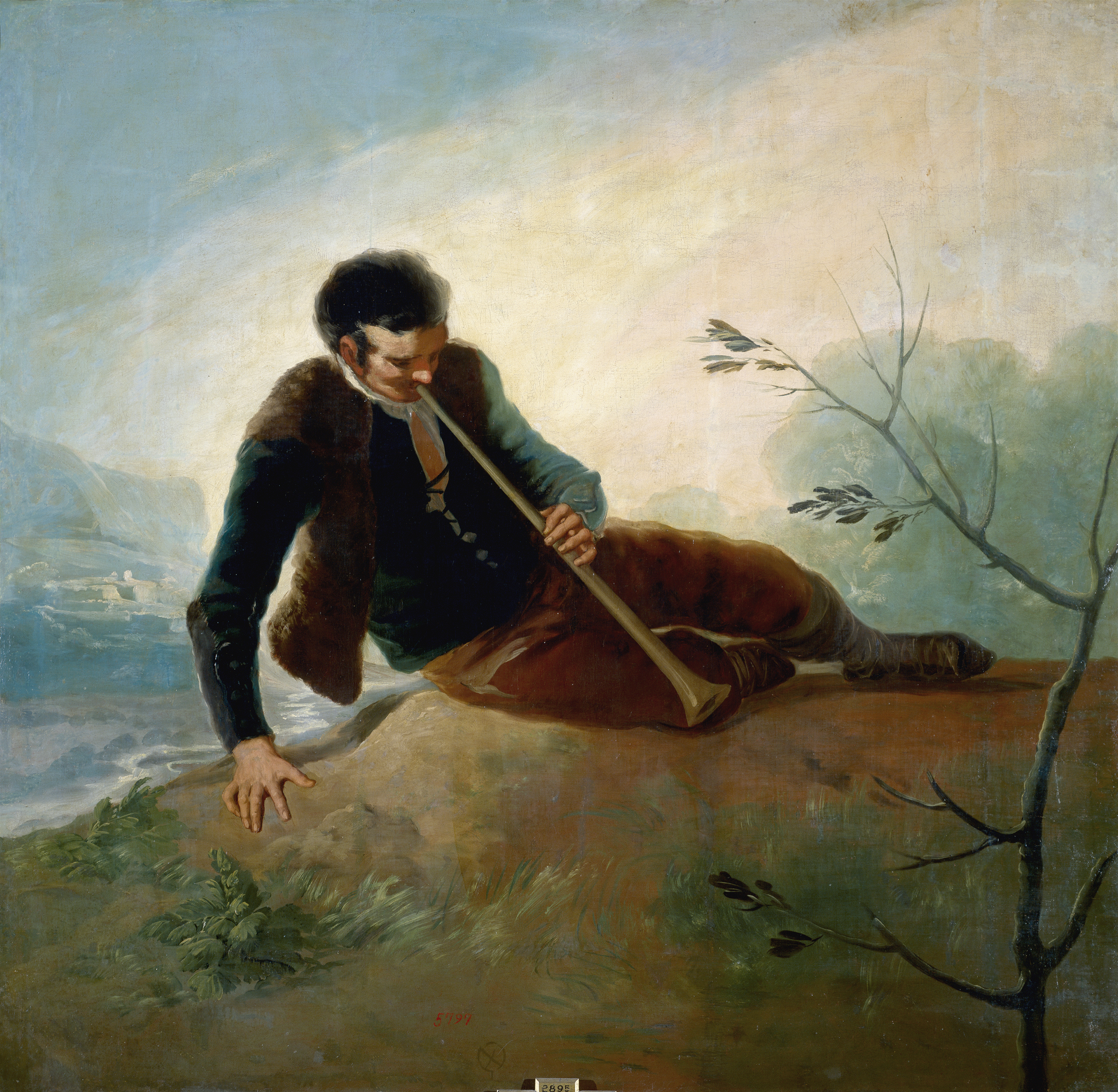
Pastor tocando la dulzaina

== Context ==
=== Goya and Romanticism ===
While the art style of Romanticism is one that scholars often find themselves debating over, many believe the style itself is tied to a certain period of time that reflects the culture of its era. However, others approach it as an overarching timeless depiction of an attitude or feeling that is carried throughout humanity. Dark Romanticism is a direct subgenre of the art style as a whole. Across the board discussion between artists and scholars alike has determined Dark Romanticism as a prevalent and important genre of visual arts. Francisco de Goya's work has contrasting opinions in regard to this specific genre of art. Many scholars deemed Goya's earlier work as light and idyllic. In his earlier work, there is a theme of happiness that instills a feeling of festivity and tranquility in its viewers. In 1792 Goya suffered a serious illness that many attribute to his shift in art work, however, some argue the opposite. There are hints of darker themes in his earlier works that go unnoticed if not looking at the bigger picture of his artistic expression. It is proven though that the drastic change in his art style was a direct result of Napoleon's invasion of Spain and the resulting Peninsular War of 1808. Goya produced the piece The Disasters of War, exhibiting his shift in expression as a result of the horrors he witnessed. This and many other works depict Goya’s switch into a Dark Romanticist way of art. This switch in themes can be evidently seen in the designs of his Four Seasons in the Fifth Series. Within the medium of tapestries, he inflicted the Dark Romanticism style and pushed critical and satirical messages. Many of Goya's works in cartoons and tapestries are negligible in scholarly discourse because they go against the status quo of the typical styles. When the exhibition Dark Romanticism: From Goya to Max Ernst was launched in 2012 there was a stark relationship between the exhibit's works and Goya's art. Goya's gradual inclusion of aspects of Dark Romanticism prove a direct engagement between the art style and the artist.

== See also ==
- List of works by Francisco Goya
