= In the Summertime (disambiguation) =

"In the Summertime" is a 1970 song by British rock band Mungo Jerry.

In the Summertime may also refer to:

- In the Summertime (film), a 1971 film by Ermanno Olmi
- "In the Summertime" (Thirsty Merc song)
- "On the Beach (In the Summertime)", a 1970 song by The 5th Dimension
- "In the Summertime", a 1965 song by Roger Miller from The Return of Roger Miller
- "In the Summertime", a 1981 song by Bob Dylan from Shot of Love
- "In the Summertime", a 2007 song by Phunk Junkeez from Hydro Phonic
- In the Summertime, a 2008 album by The Wrights

== See also ==
- Summertime (disambiguation)
- Sunny Afternoon, song by the Kinks featuring "In the summertime" as a tag line
