= Springtime (1929 film) =

1929 film by Ub Iwerks

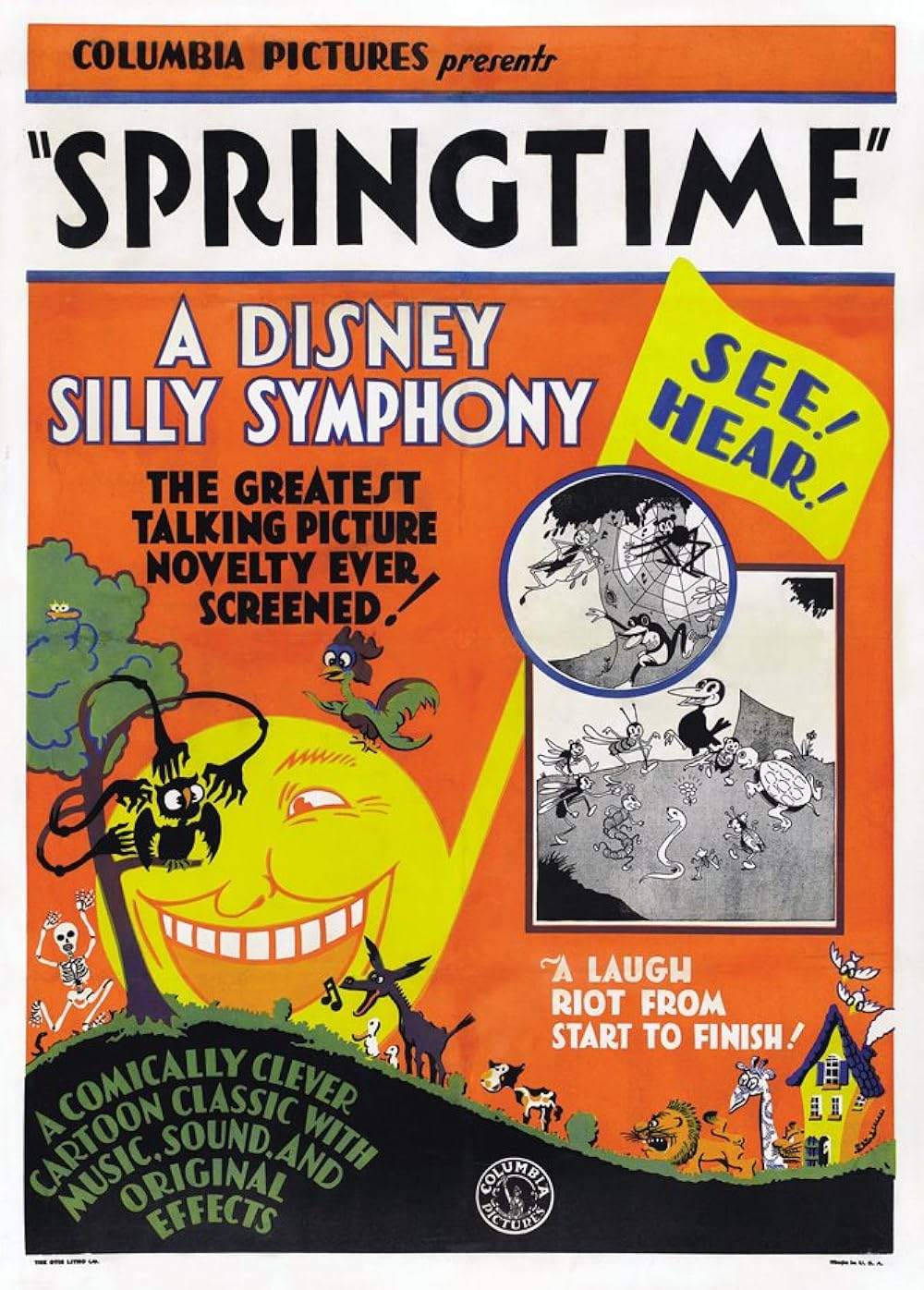
- Theatrical release poster
- Directed by: Ub Iwerks
- Produced by: Walt Disney
- Music by: Carl W. Stalling
- Animation by: Wilfred Jackson; Les Clark
- Backgrounds by: Carlos Manriquez
- Production company: Disney Cartoons
- Distributed by: Columbia Pictures
- Release date: October 24, 1929
- Running time: 6:14
- Country: United States
- Language: English

Springtime is a 1929 animated short film directed by Ub Iwerks. It is the third Silly Symphonies film, released just five days before the 1929 Stock Market Crash. The short entered the US public domain on January 1, 2025. (Note: While the notice in the renewal is listed as 1930, the notice on the physical short is 1929. The short will enter the public domain based on the earlier notice.)

== Plot ==
The short

The film starts with trees, flowers, butterflies and birds dancing in harmony. Three flowers dance, before one of them reveals two ladybirds, which also dance. A caterpillar splits itself into many parts, before a blackbird in a top hat eats the parts one by one. The blackbird goes to his mate, who hatches four eggs. The chicks dance and squawk in harmony. Then, a storm starts, with a tree itching itself before lightning strikes its backside. Two crickets hiding under mushrooms emerge after the rain subsides, before hopping along. The crickets end up jumping into a frogs mouth, said frog starts dancing, plays on some turtles like instruments, and then continues dancing. A spider swings from a tree, dances and plays its web like a harp. Three other frogs dace and croak in sync. A heron emerges from the cattails. Four frogs are spotted by it, so the swallow one another in size order before only is left. After a chase, the heron grabs the frog and throws it eating each of the frogs. The heron then jumps in some ponds, before it falls in a larger pond.

== Reception ==
Motion Picture News (November 2, 1929): "A Panic. Another contribution to the entertainment of the nation. Walt Disney has been hitting an extremely high average with his various cartoon series. This one is well worth whatever praise this reporter may bestow upon it. The basis of the amusing antics is the line which ruminates about springtime, love and levity. Everything turns terpsichore: flowers, spiders, cranes, frogs. The routines they pass through are guaranteed to make any audience laugh."

The Film Daily (November 3, 1929): "This is called a Disney Silly Symphony, and it is a corker. The cartoon work is about the best that has ever been seen in the animated field, the expressions and general antics of the animals being unusually clever as well as true to life. A series of frogs graduating in size are swallowed by each other in turn, till only the last big frog is left. This one in turn is swallowed by a long-legged bird, who is so weighted down that he flops in a pond and is drowned. The clever conceit is a fine satire on the survival of the fittest in the animal world. The synchronized music accompanying the dancing music of the frogs adds greatly to the laughs, which come easily."

Variety (February 12, 1930): "Another amusing, ingeniously made cartoon comedy drawn by Walt Disney. Oke for any theatre. In Springtime Disney has sought to express that vernal feeling of animated insect, animal and flower characters in novel dance routines set to intriguing musical numbers. Timing of the dances, the accompanying taps, etc., is so perfect that the rhythm alone imparts rare entertainment value to this new one in the Silly Symphony series. Every opportunity to inject comedy for laughs has also been seized. Some repetition in the nature of the dance routines but not serious."

== Home media ==
The short was released on December 19, 2006, on Walt Disney Treasures: More Silly Symphonies, Volume Two.

== Legacy ==
Springtime started a cycle of four Silly Symphonies themed after the seasons. The other three were released the following year - Summer, Autumn, and Winter.

This film makes an appearance in the 1961 animated film One Hundred and One Dalmatians (also made by Disney), when the Dalmatian puppies are watching TV with Jasper and Horace.

Similarly, one of the music pieces from the latter half of the short would later be reused for the full "Dance of the Hours" segment in Walt Disney's 1940 film, Fantasia.

In 1993, to coincide with the opening of Mickey's Toontown in Disneyland, a shortened cover of the cartoon's music was arranged to be featured in the land's background ambiance.
