= Jeremy Gloff =

American singer-songwriter

Jeremy Gloff is an American performance artist, advice columnist, singer, and songwriter.

== Biography ==
Early songs, including "Straight Femme" (from 1995's "Heavy Machinery") had lyrics such as: "It's an ugly paradox when he's on top of Goldilocks. Well I'm not the only one who thinks he swings both ways."

1999's "Green Arrow" was about obsessive-compulsive disorder: "Its 2:00... at 2:03. If the floor's wet you'll die lonely, Ten hang-ups on his machine, The sickness of a routine."

"Leaving" (from 1996's Midnight Blooming) offered clues to a transitional period for Gloff, both in his personal life and in his music. He would ultimately leave New York and re-emerge in Tampa, FL in 2000 with the release of "Spin Girl Spin":

"It is obvious Gloff is doing his damnest [sic] to shake himself from the ghosts of his past. The tuneful quirkiness of his home-recorded releases is replaced with an almost anonymous indie-rock sound.... But despite the transitional nature of this album, many of the songs are dark and haunting. It's easy to get lost in the gorgeous wonder of "Infrawhite" or to feel the rage in "Johnny". You can hear a very disturbed person in these minor chord mini epics."

== Following ==
As an openly gay performer singing about his life and issues as a gay man, Jeremy's music has been (if anything) most popular among gay and lesbian audiences and venues in Tampa, FL, where he is regarded as one of the "local scene's best GLBT musicians"

Historically, there have been notable discrepancies in how Gloff's lyrics and subject matter are received, among gay and straight reviewers:

A March 1999 review in Ink 19 had this to say about 1999's self-titled "Jeremy Gloff": "Over 14 songs, Jeremy lets us in to his world, and sometimes it's a very scary place to be."

Meanwhile, Queer Radio describes Jeremy's work as "Lyrically very honest and refreshing."

== Career in Tampa ==
Gloff toured with Seattle's Betty X and Portland's Summer in 2004. This tour led to Gloff and Summer releasing albums with an experimental, freely redistributable "open source licensing" scheme under the Lossless Records label.

Now's The Right Time To Feel Good was #10 on OutVoice's Online GLBT Top 40 CD Chart in 2006.

His music was featured on the soundtrack for the 2006 film "Hooked", which was a documentary exploring the "online cruising" phenomenon in the gay community.

Gloff's music appeared on Don Waters 2006 compilation Kitestringing: The Prison Literature Project Benefit CD.

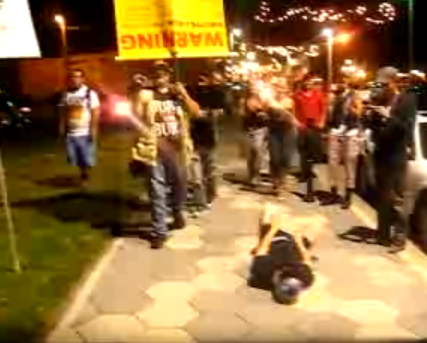
Jeremy Gloff dancing in an anti-gay rally in Tampa (2008). One of the protesters at the event would later remark: "I just remembered the performance by Jeremy Gloff, you know the guy who danced around in short shorts. I'm sorry you guys had to see that."

2008 saw the album release of "1987", a send-off of 1980s dance music, and a radical departure from Gloff's earlier work. Jeremy received a jab for the dance album in an appearance on Penn & Teller: Bullshit! (Season 6, episode 10).

In June 2008, Jeremy was performing a cover of Jill Jones acoustic song "So Much in Love" in New York (in the dance style of "1987") and Jill surprised audience members by getting up on stage to sing along.

Jeremy Gloff's visibility has increased recently on the Tampa Bay scene. His song "Losing Fahrenheit" was featured in the soundtrack from 2009's independent documentary Strip Club King: The story of Joe Redner. Jeremy was in attendance at the film's March 2009 premier in Ybor City.

Jeremy is also a visual artist, well known for pulling visual pranks on locals and protesters in Ybor City. In June 2009, the Tampa Bay Times named him "Artist of the Day": "Simultaneously funny, twisted, spunky and inspirational, Jeremy Gloff is an icon in Tampa Bay. Whether he dazzles audiences via his ever-changing performance styles, "Rickrolls" passersby in Ybor City or provides insight by way of his advice column, "Dear Gloffy," in Reax Magazine, he hasn't failed to entertain and surprise his fans."

Tampa Bay's WMNF 88.5FM has had similar comments about Gloff's eccentric and engaging performance style: "With a voice that recalls Michael Stipe in a helium cloud and a piano-driven songwriting style that hovers somewhere between Ben Folds' snarky epics and R.E.M.'s rolling diary entries, one of Tampa's favorite eccentrics is often a breathtaking talent, a man capable of gut-wrenching crescendos and swoony melodies. That said, Gloff is also a bit of a nutter. And I mean that in a good way, too."

== Discography ==
=== Albums ===
True Stories (1993)
Still Feel It (1994)
Heavy Machinery (1995)
Below The Velvet (1996)
Midnight Blooming (1996)
Songs About Stupid People (1997)
Jeremy's Wonderland (1997)
Autumn (1998)
Jeremy Gloff (1998)
Spin Girl Spin (2000)
America Is Lonely Tonight (2001)
Romantico (2003)
The Orange Songs (2004)
Now's The Right Time To Feel Good (2006)
1987 (2008)
21st Century Love Songs (2009)
THIS (2011)
Inside Of Blue Buildings (2013)
Hurricane Lullabies: The Best Of Jeremy Gloff (2015)
Those Who Survived (2016)
