= Autumn (1930 film) =

1930 film by Ub Iwerks

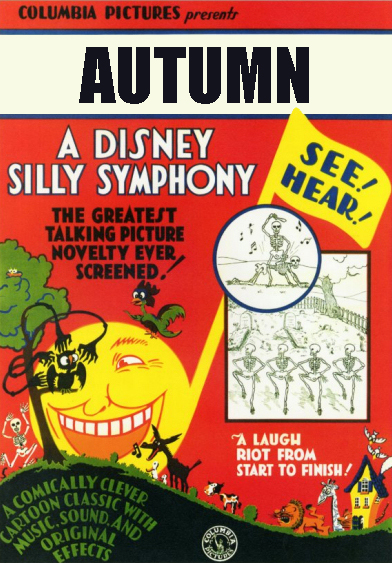
- Directed by: Ub Iwerks
- Produced by: Walt Disney
- Music by: Carl W. Stalling
- Backgrounds by: Carlos Manriquez
- Production company: Disney Cartoons
- Distributed by: Columbia Pictures
- Release date: February 13, 1930
- Running time: 6:24
- Country: United States
- Language: English
- Budget: $9,129.46

The short film

Autumn is a 1930 American animated short film directed by Ub Iwerks. It is the seventh film in the Silly Symphonies series. It was released on February 13, 1930. It was the final film to be animated by Iwerks and composed by Carl W. Stalling at Walt Disney Productions, who left the studio to form Animated Pictures. It was the third season themed Silly Symphony following Springtime and Summer, but preceding Winter.

== Summary ==
The film starts with a group of squirrels collecting resources for the winter months like nuts and corn. One of the squirrels tries to get a nut down from a tree, but after failing twice, it finally gets the nut down, only for it to grow legs. Once the squirrel smashes the nut open, a caterpillar emerges and struts off.

As the squirrels gather corn and store it in a tree hole, a duo of crows steals them just as the squirrels go back for more, before going to their flock and storing the corn for themselves inside of a scarecrow.

Meanwhile, a skunk gathers a pumpkin, but gets frustrated as it doesn't fit, and ends up destroying it. Then, a Porcupine gathers apples, using its quills to hold them, it then stores the apples in a log.

Many beavers build their dam with mud, while two beavers musically bite into a tree to chop it down. As a flock of ducks eat water plants, one of them gets a shoe stuck on its head.

Then, the wind starts to blow, signalling the ducks to migrate away, the beavers go to hide in their dam, as a stray duck tries to join, but is kicked out. The porcupine goes to hide in the log the apples were in, the skunk tries to join, but is quill-ed. The skunk goes into a tree, yet scares all the squirrels out. The crows go into their scarecrow home, but leave a smaller crow out, before one of the crows snatch the smaller one inside. Ending the short.

== Production ==
Work on the film started around January of 1930, just 1 month before its release. During this time, Ub Iwerks and Carl Stalling left the Disney studio after some fall out with Walt. This led to almost if not all Disney cartoons to be delayed and go behind schedule, including this one. It's due delivery day was on February 1 and because of their departure, it was delivered much later and it's New York opening had to be changed two months later. This film, like other Disney shorts included classical music pieces like "Valse Arabesque" by Theodore Lack, and "Murmuring Brook" by Edouard Poldini.

== Reception ==
Motion Picture News (August 2, 1930): "Well done, but constructed along the same lines as most cartoons, the majority of which depend on fantastic stepping by the animal characters to put it over. The musical renditions are splendid".

== Home media ==
The short was released on December 19, 2006, on Walt Disney Treasures: More Silly Symphonies, Volume Two.
