= Somers =

Somers may refer to:

== Places ==
In Australia

- Somers, Victoria

In the United States

- Somers, Connecticut, a town
  - Somers (CDP), Connecticut, the central village in the town
  - Somers Historic District, in the center of the village
- Somers, Iowa
- Somers, Montana
- Somers, New York
- Somers Point, New Jersey
- Somers, Wisconsin, a village
- Somers (town), Wisconsin, a town

== Other uses ==
- Somers (surname)
- USS Somers
- Somers Limited, financial corporation on the Bermuda Stock Exchange.

== See also ==
- Sommers
