= Justice Summers =

Justice Summers may refer to:

- Augustus N. Summers (1856–1927), associate justice of the Ohio Supreme Court
- Hardy Summers (1933–2012), associate justice of the Oklahoma Supreme Court

== See also ==
- Increase Sumner (1746–1799), associate justice of the Massachusetts Supreme Judicial Court
