= Riña de gatos =

Painting by Francisco de Goya

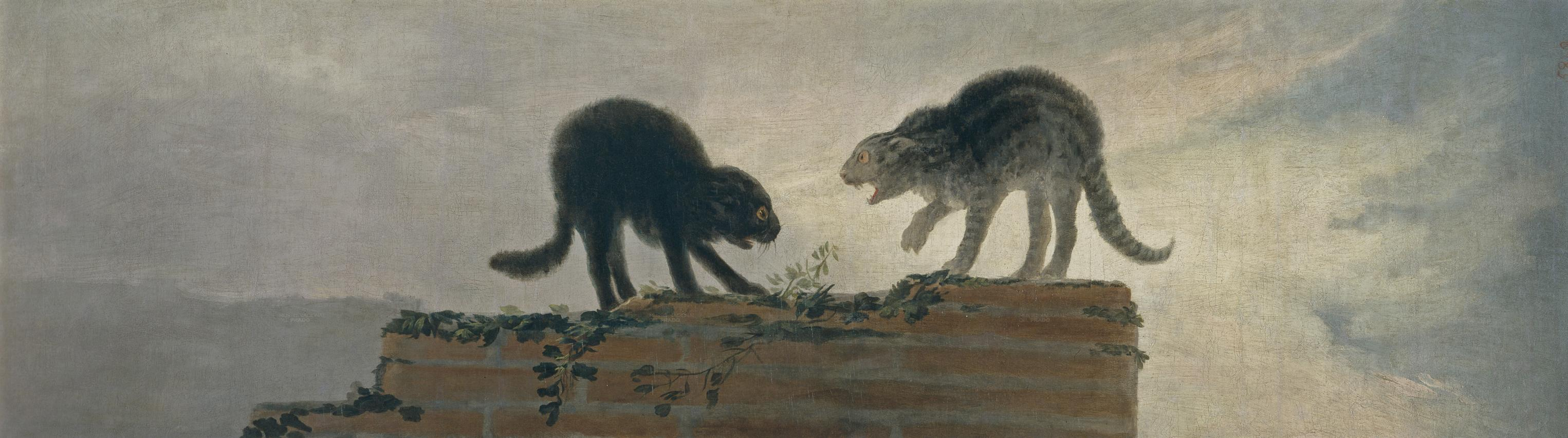
- Artist: Francisco de Goya
- Year: 1786 to 1787
- Medium: Oil on canvas
- Movement: Pre-Romanticism
- Dimensions: 56 cm × 193 cm (22 in × 76 in)
- Location: Museo del Prado, Madrid

Riña de gatos or Los gatos (lit. 'Cat Fight' or 'The Cats') is a tapestry cartoon by Francisco Goya. It was created as part of the fifth series of cartoons for tapestries by the Aragonese artist, intended to decorate the dining room of the Prince and Princess of Asturias in the Royal Palace of El Pardo.

It was transferred to the Prado Museum in 1870, but remained in the museum's basement until 1986, when it was added to the permanent collection.

== Analysis ==
Two cats fight atop a brick wall. The horizontal format of the work allows it to be identified as a transom painting. Goya analyzes the nature of the animal, depicting them with great realism. The painter would repeat this theme in his Caprichos series and had previously done so in his Italian Sketchbook.

There has been considerable controversy among scholars regarding the authorship of the painting, as it bears no relation to the series of cartoons that Goya painted for El Pardo. Nor are the typical features of Goya's painting style very clearly visible, perhaps due to the long period of time that the cartoon spent in a basement exposed to humidity.

Despite this, the fact that it features only animals is a striking gesture. The positions of the cats allow for an important study of nature. The perspective is traditional in the felts, as in The Drinker.

== See also ==
- List of Francisco Goya's tapestry cartoons
