= Summer (1930 film) =

1930 film by Ub Iwerks

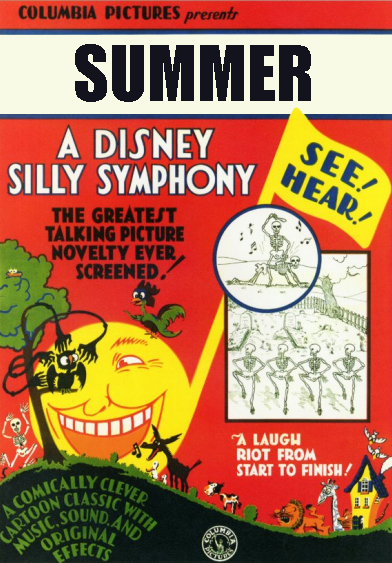
- Directed by: Ub Iwerks
- Produced by: Walt Disney
- Music by: Carl W. Stalling
- Animation by: Ub Iwerks; Wilfred Jackson; Les Clark; Jack Cutting; Floyd Gottfredson
- Backgrounds by: Carlos Manriquez
- Production company: Walt Disney Productions
- Distributed by: Columbia Pictures
- Release date: January 16, 1930
- Running time: 5:51
- Country: United States
- Language: English

The short film

Summer is a 1930 American animated short film directed by Ub Iwerks. It is the sixth film in the Silly Symphonies series, It was released on January 16, 1930. It is the sequel to the 1929 short Springtime and the precursor to the shorts Autumn and Winter.

== Summary ==
The short film begins with several caterpillars dancing towards some flowers. The caterpillars enter the flowers, and then emerge from the flowers as butterflies. They fly and pollinate every flower they pass over. Butterflies fly on a branch but disturb a stick with legs. The stick threatens them with its teeth. Then the stick dances and falls into a river. A dragonfly flies over the river, accompanying two ladybirds. Two dung beetles play with a ball of excrement on the ground. They lose the ball of excrement, which crashes into a tree trunk and explodes. When it explodes, its pieces turn into little flying insects, which dance. So do four flies on a flower. The flies then carry a spider's web with them and play leapfrog with the spider, but the spider eats the flies. The spider dances on the spider's web, but the spider's web was tied to a tree and the tree falls on it. This is how the film ends.

== Reception ==
Motion Picture News (February 1, 1930): "Simply Grand. And still they come! This young man, named Walt Disney, is helping to supply an entire nation with a constant load of laughs. The Silly Symphony series in Summer adds another to a long list of delightful bits of cartoon humor. The animation by Ub Iwerks is clever in the extreme. He gets the most ludicrous of situations from his characters which, with the additional nicely timed and properly selected music, make this one reeler exactly what it is."

Variety (February 26, 1930): "Good anywhere. A Disney creation in the Silly Symphony series. One objection is that it resembles too keenly a previous release by the same maker called Springtime. In both creations weather breezes are denoted through leaping and contortionist insects, plants, and in a similar manner. Withal, however, it has its snickers. Seizing upon caterpillars and butterflies to express the freedom of musical summer carries its own laughs, which in essence is the spirit of the present cartoon. Carl Stalling's musical arrangement is light, airy and rhythmic."

== Home media ==
The short was released on December 19, 2006, on Walt Disney Treasures: More Silly Symphonies, Volume Two.
