= Summertime Blues (disambiguation) =

Summertime Blues is a 1958 song by Eddie Cochran.

Summertime Blues may also refer to:

- Summertime Blues (album), a 1966 album by Eddie Cochran
- Summertime Blues (1984 film), a Hebrew-language youth drama film directed by Yaky Yosha
- Summer Time Blues (1985 film), alternative title of Rockin' Road Trip, a comedy directed by William Olsen
- Summertime Blues (EP), a 2022 EP by Zach Bryan
