= Summers, West Virginia =

- Unincorporated community
- Location within West Virginia Location within the United States
- Coordinates: 39°09′27″N 80°49′43″W
- Country: United States
- State: West Virginia
- County: Doddridge
- Elevation: 820 ft (250 m)
- Time zone: UTC-5 (Eastern (EST))
  - Summer (DST): UTC-4 (EDT)
- Area codes: 304 & 681
- GNIS feature ID: 1549945

Summers is an unincorporated community in Doddridge County, West Virginia, United States. Summers is 10 miles (16 km) south-southwest of West Union.
