= Marshall Summar =

American geneticist (born 1959)

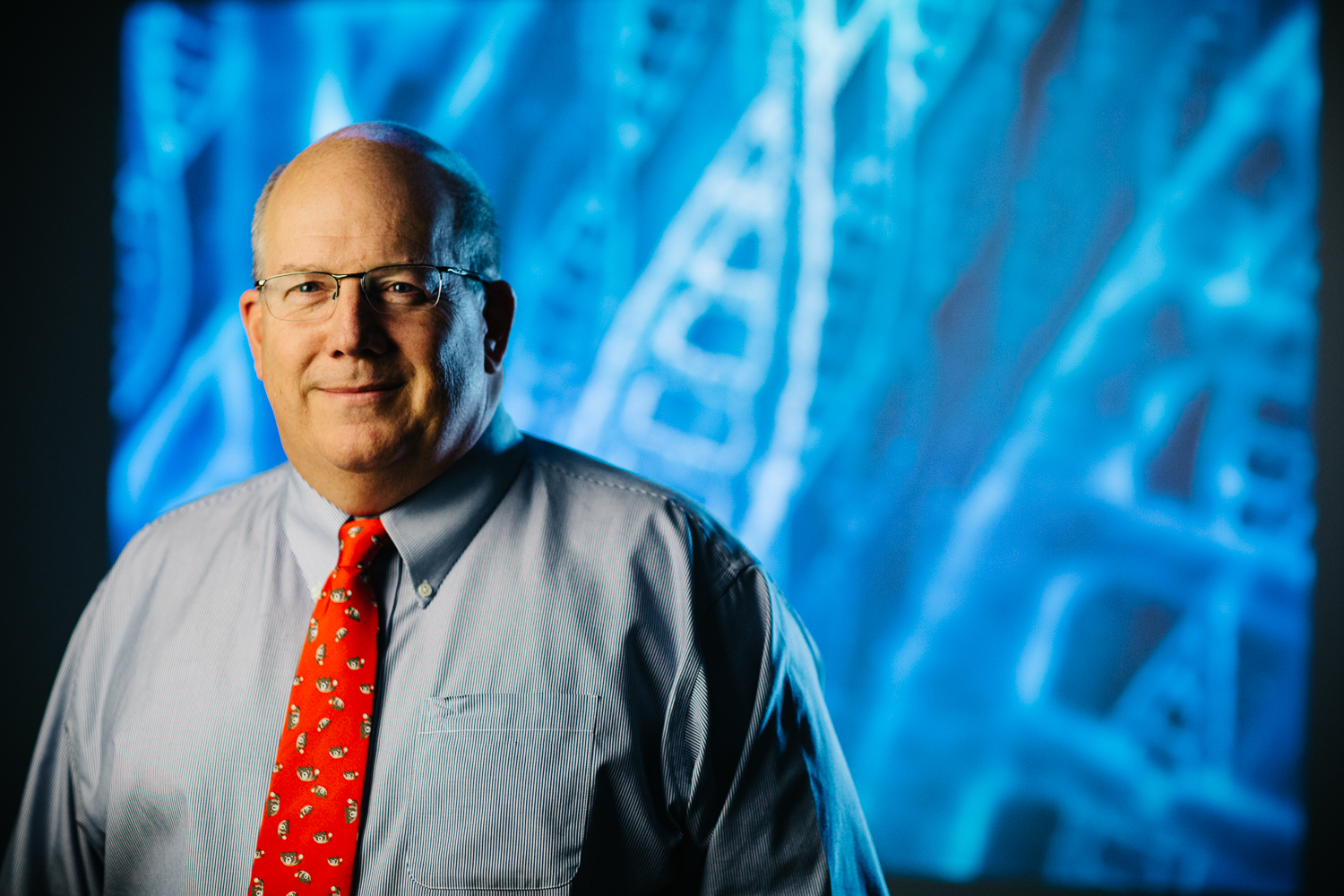
- Born: September 2, 1959 (age 66)
- Education: Vanderbilt University and University of Tennessee Health Science Center
- Known for: rare disease, urea cycle disorders
- Scientific career
- Workplaces: Children's National, Vanderbilt University, Uncommon Cures LLC

Marshall L. Summar (born September 2, 1959, in Nashville, Tennessee) is an American physician, clinical geneticist and academic specializing in the field of genetics and rare disease. He is board-certified in pediatrics, biochemical genetics and clinical genetics. He is best known for his work in caring and developing treatments for children with rare genetic diseases.

Summar is the Chief Executive Officer of Uncommon Cures. In 2022, he stepped down as Director of the Rare Disease Institute and as Chief of Genetics and Metabolism at Children's National Hospital in Washington D.C.. He was the Margaret O'Malley Professor of Genetic Medicine at Children's National Health System in Washington, D.C. He's also an Emeritus Professor in the Department of Pediatrics at the George Washington University School of Medicine & Health Sciences.

== Biography ==
Summar received his B.S. in Molecular Biology from Vanderbilt University in 1981 and his M.D. from the University of Tennessee Center for Health Sciences in 1985. He performed his pediatric residency at Vanderbilt University School of Medicine. From 1988-1990, Summar completed his clinical fellowship within the Division of Medical Genetics at Vanderbilt University School of Medicine – he trained in clinical/biochemical genetics and in genetics research.

From 1990 to 2010, Summar remained with Vanderbilt University School of Medicine, serving first as an associate and assistant professor. In 2008, he was named a tenured professor of the Department of Pediatrics and the Department of Molecular Physiology & Biophysics. While at Vanderbilt, Summar served as the vice-president of the University Faculty Senate and Served on the Chancellor's Advisory Committee.

Summar joined Children's National in 2010 as chief of the Division of Genetics and Metabolism, and became professor of Pediatrics at George Washington School of Medicine. From 2016 to 2020 Summar served as chairman of the board of directors for the National Organization for Rare Disorders (NORD), after serving as chair of the organization's scientific and medical advisory committee. He served on the NIH NCATS Advisory Council from 2021-2024. He serves as a Commissioner for the Global Commission to End the Diagnostic Odyssey for Children with a Rare Disease. He is on the steering committee of the Black Women's Health Imperative Rare Disease Diversity Coalition and co-chairs the research committee. Summar serves on the Board of Directors of PHLOW pharmaceuticals, a public benefit corporation moving generic drug manufacturing into the United States. In 2022, Summar was awarded the National Organization for Rare Disorders Lifetime Achievement Award.

In January 2017 under Summar's leadership, Children's National announced the formation of the Children's National Rare Disease Institute (CNRDI), center dedicated to advancing the care and treatment of children and adults with rare genetic disorders. The CNRDI was designated by NORD as the first Center of Excellence for Clinical Care in Rare Disease in the United States.

In 2023, Summar led a team, including Dr. Rob Freishtat, to found a rare disease clinical research organization, Uncommon Cures LLC. The goal of UCC is to promote efficiency through strategic centralization and decentralization of research practices in the rare disease field. Since 2022, Summar, Debra Rebier, and Paul Harris have led a team in a collaboration between Children's National Hospital and Vanderbilt University building a new software platform to create and host clinical treatment protocols for rare diseases. This RareCap program will provide a curated database of treatment protocols to address the rapidly expanding number of described rare diseases.

== Research ==
Summar has published over 170 peer-reviewed articles and is considered an international expert on inborn errors of metabolism, specifically urea cycle disorders. His laboratory is best known for its work on rare disorders involving ammonia and nitrogen metabolism. Summar's work on urea cycle disorders has involved translational research, development of treatment protocols, and basic molecular research into rare defects in urea and nitrogen metabolism.

Summar also specializes in the development of devices and therapies for patients with rare genetic and biochemical diseases, as well as applying knowledge from rare disorders to mainstream medicine. His current research is focused on the interactions between the environment and common genetic variations and involves research in asthma, heart disease, oxidant injury, pulmonary hypertension, liver disease, and Down syndrome.

Summar's work has yielded more than 120 international patents, as well as new therapies in clinical trials (including FDA studies) for patients dealing with congenital heart disease, sickle cell anemia, and premature birth.

In addition to his laboratory's research, Summar has focused on newborn screening and telehealth policy issues and the development of testing and follow-up systems. He has also organized and headed international work groups focused on developing standards of care and treatment for rare disorders and developed a program in coordination with the NIH to help young children benefit from NIH research initiatives.

== Selected publications ==
- Summar, Marshall L.; Koelker, Stefan; Freedenberg, Debra; Le Mons, Cynthia; Haberle, Johannes; Lee, Hye-Seung; Kirmse, Brian (2013-09-01). "The incidence of urea cycle disorders". Molecular Genetics and Metabolism. Special Issue: Diagnosis. 110 (1): 179–180. doi:10.1016/j.ymgme.2013.07.008. ISSN 1096-7192. PMC 4364413. PMID 23972786.
- Gropman, A. L.; Summar, M.; Leonard, J. V. (2007). "Neurological implications of urea cycle disorders". Journal of Inherited Metabolic Disease. 30 (6): 865–879. doi:10.1007/s10545-007-0709-5. ISSN 0141-8955. PMC 3758693. PMID 18038189.
- Kölker, Stefan; Cazorla, Angeles Garcia; Valayannopoulos, Vassili; Lund, Allan M.; Burlina, Alberto B.; Sykut-Cegielska, Jolanta; Wijburg, Frits A.; Teles, Elisa Leão; Zeman, Jiri; Dionisi-Vici, Carlo; Barić, Ivo; Karall, Daniela; Augoustides-Savvopoulou, Persephone; Aksglaede, Lise; Arnoux, Jean-Baptiste (2015). "The phenotypic spectrum of organic acidurias and urea cycle disorders. Part 1: the initial presentation". Journal of Inherited Metabolic Disease. 38 (6): 1041–1057. doi:10.1007/s10545-015-9839-3. hdl:20.500.11940/5353. ISSN 0141-8955. PMID 25875215.
- Summar, Marshall L; Dobbelaere, Dries; Brusilow, Saul; Lee, Brendan (2008). "Diagnosis, symptoms, frequency and mortality of 260 patients with urea cycle disorders from a 21-year, multicentre study of acute hyperammonaemic episodes". Acta Paediatrica. 97 (10): 1420–1425. doi:10.1111/j.1651-2227.2008.00952.x. ISSN 1651-2227. PMC 2675643. PMID 18647279.
- Kölker, Stefan; Valayannopoulos, Vassili; Burlina, Alberto B.; Sykut-Cegielska, Jolanta; Wijburg, Frits A.; Teles, Elisa Leão; Zeman, Jiri; Dionisi-Vici, Carlo; Barić, Ivo; Karall, Daniela; Arnoux, Jean-Baptiste; Avram, Paula; Baumgartner, Matthias R.; Blasco-Alonso, Javier; Boy, S. P. Nikolas (2015). "The phenotypic spectrum of organic acidurias and urea cycle disorders. Part 2: the evolving clinical phenotype". Journal of Inherited Metabolic Disease. 38 (6): 1059–1074. doi:10.1007/s10545-015-9840-x. hdl:20.500.11940/5367. ISSN 1573-2665. PMID 25875216.
- Batshaw, Mark L.; Tuchman, Mendel; Summar, Marshall; Seminara, Jennifer (2014-09-01). "A longitudinal study of urea cycle disorders". Molecular Genetics and Metabolism. SI:Newborn Screening. 113 (1): 127–130. doi:10.1016/j.ymgme.2014.08.001. ISSN 1096-7192. PMC 4178008. PMID 25135652.
- Gamble, Karen L.; Motsinger-Reif, Alison A.; Hida, Akiko; Borsetti, Hugo M.; Servick, Stein V.; Ciarleglio, Christopher M.; Robbins, Sam; Hicks, Jennifer; Carver, Krista; Hamilton, Nalo; Wells, Nancy; Summar, Marshall L.; McMahon, Douglas G.; Johnson, Carl Hirschie (2011-04-13). "Shift Work in Nurses: Contribution of Phenotypes and Genotypes to Adaptation". PLOS ONE. 6 (4) e18395. Bibcode:2011PLoSO...618395G. doi:10.1371/journal.pone.0018395. ISSN 1932-6203. PMC 3076422. PMID 21533241.
- Summar, Marshall L.; Barr, Frederick; Dawling, Sheila; Smith, Wendy; Lee, Brendan; Singh, Rani H.; Rhead, William J.; King, Lisa Sniderman; Christman, Brian W. (2005-10-01). "Unmasked Adult-Onset Urea Cycle Disorders in the Critical Care Setting". Critical Care Clinics. 21 (4): S1–S8. doi:10.1016/j.ccc.2005.05.002. ISSN 0749-0704. PMID 16227111.
- Ciarleglio, Christopher M.; Ryckman, Kelli K.; Servick, Stein V.; Hida, Akiko; Robbins, Sam; Wells, Nancy; Hicks, Jennifer; Larson, Sydney A.; Wiedermann, Joshua P.; Carver, Krista; Hamilton, Nalo; Kidd, Kenneth K.; Kidd, Judith R.; Smith, Jeffrey R.; Friedlaender, Jonathan (2008-08-01). "Genetic Differences in Human Circadian Clock Genes among Worldwide Populations". Journal of Biological Rhythms. 23 (4): 330–340. doi:10.1177/0748730408320284. ISSN 0748-7304. PMC 2579796. PMID 18663240.
