= Summer Watson =

British singer

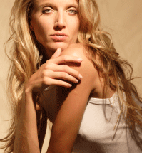
- Summer Watson in April 2010

Background information
- Born: 14 September 1977 (age 48)
- Origin: Weymouth, Dorset, England
- Genres: Classical, Crossover music, Operatic pop music, world
- Occupation: Singer (soprano)
- Years active: 1999–present
- Label: Sony Classical
- Website: Summer Watson

Summer Watson (born 14 September 1977) is an English soprano.

== Background ==
Watson grew up in East Sussex and Oxfordshire as her parents' only child. She began to play the recorder at the age of four, and continued with the flute and the piano later on. She was also singing hymns from an early age, and took part in local music competitions throughout her childhood. At the age of nine, Watson began to learn singing.

While attending Didcot Girls' School in Oxfordshire, Watson vacillated between pursuing French or music, but by the age of 16, she had decided to pursue a career in music.

== Education ==
Watson won a place to study at Royal College of Music training as an opera singer, which included studying German and Italian. She received several grants, including the Anne Driver Trust award. She came second in the Llangollen International Singer competition.

In 2002, Watson completed her postgraduate diploma at the Royal College of Music, graduating with distinction. She continued her opera training in Vienna, living there for two years, studying with Jendrick Springer at the Vienna State Opera from 2007 through 2008.

== Career ==
In her final year at the Royal College of Music, Watson organised a debut concert, which attracted the Duke and Duchess of York as well as Elle Macpherson, George Michael and others.

Described as "a classically trained vocalist whose rich, sumptuous voice can soar effortlessly over music written by some of the world's all time greatest composers", Watson has performed in various public and private events in Europe, Asia, and the US, working with the Royal Philharmonic Orchestra in a number of concerts, including at Cadogan Hall. She has also been a performer in the Royal Households of the United Kingdom, most markedly with her performance to celebrate the 60th anniversary of the Royal Philharmonic Orchestra at Buckingham Palace.

Over the years, Watson has also sung in various benefit concerts. She has performed for Children in Crisis, British Red Cross and The Head & Neck Cancer Research Trust of The Royal Marsden Hospital in London, where she also sang for the Indian charity of Magic Bus in a Gala Dinner attended by Elizabeth Hurley among others at the Park Lane Hotel. Watson has also performed on behalf of a Sir Winston Churchill charity at Blenheim Palace in England and for the Anti-Human Trafficking Campaign for the United Nations at Hofburg Imperial Palace in Austria. Watson has worked for AdoptSriLanka.com to help re-build the community of Sri Lanka after the destruction of the 2004 Indian Ocean tsunami.

In 2008, Watson performed in the Bonachela Dance Company production Square Map of Q4 at the Queen Elizabeth Hall, singing music created by Marius de Vries (producer of the film Moulin Rouge! and performers such as Madonna and Björk). Later that same year, Watson completed a UK tour of arenas in Birmingham, London, Manchester, Sheffield, Belfast, and Dublin. She sang as the lead performer with Young Voices to sold-out arenas of up to 19,000 people, including The 02 and the Royal Albert Hall. Watson also opened up the Julia Clancey fashion show at Smashbox Studios during the 2008 Los Angeles Fashion Week, singing Mal di Luna, a vocal arrangement of Moonight Sonata by Ludwig van Beethoven.

In 2009, Watson performed as a soloist with the Royal Philharmonic Orchestra at Priory Park, Southend-on-Sea, England, as part of the annual benefit concert series, Concerts in the Park, organised by the Rotary Club of Rayleigh Mill. Watson also performed with The Celtic Tenors in Los Angeles and the RDS Concert Hall in Dublin, Ireland. In 2010, Watson sang at The 2010 Genlux Britweek Designer of the Year Award and Fashion Show in Los Angeles, honouring the British designer Matthew Williamson, and travelled to Iceland, exploring the country and headlining a major Christmas concert with Paul Potts and Alexander Rybak in Reykjavík.

As of 2011, Watson has been spending time in Los Angeles, where she has also recorded for DreamWorks films. She is working on an album with Burt Bacharach.

=== Summer ===
Watson signed a £1 million recording contract with Sony Classical in 2002. The programme of her self-titled debut album Summer, created by Watson herself and producer Nick Patrick, is a collection of classical, popular and world music, including pieces and arrangements of music by Ludwig van Beethoven, Antonín Dvořák, Gabriel Fauré, Geminiano Giacomelli, Benjamin Godard, Ennio Morricone, Stanley Myers, Joaquín Rodrigo, Sting, Richard Strauss and others.

The album was recorded at Abbey Road Studios with the Royal Philharmonic Orchestra, conducted and arranged by Nick Ingman. Other recording studios included Air Lyndhurst and Townhouse Studios, while the London Session Orchestra provided additional strings. Watson worked with various musicians during the recording of the album, including Pino Palladino, Richard Harvey, Nigel Hitchcock, Dominic Miller and John Parricelli. She also had Roger Vignoles as her accompanist in Sposa son disprezzata, and Marcelo Álvarez as her duet partner in Tutta La Vita by Matteo Saggese. Choirs on the album are the London Oratory School Schola and Metro Voices.

Described as a "seamless fusion between classical and ethnic music that is both emotively powerful and intellectually satisfying", Summer was released internationally in 2003, peaking at number 1 on the US iTunes and number 2 on the UK Classical Charts. "Her name says it all—she's bright, blonde and beautiful, with the talent and determination to take the music world by storm – a potential superstar", declared Classic FM Magazine, while Arena named her as "the Norah Jones of 2003". The Daily Express described the album as "very chilled out in a classical way."

== Personal ==
Watson names Renée Fleming and Joan Sutherland as her inspirations. She says that Annie Lennox and Sting have had a big impact on her, while Paul Oakenfold has been a major influence as well. Watson also loves Joshua Bell's albums of violin music, and enjoys going to Ronnie Scott's Jazz Club in London. Her other musical favourites include the Icelandic post-rock band Sigur Rós.
