= Summertime '57/'58 =

Canadian music variety show

- Genre: Variety show
- Presented by: Bill Walker
- Country of origin: Canada
- Original language: English
- No. of seasons: 2

Production
- Producers: Len Casey (1957); Norm Sedawie (1958)
- Running time: 30 minutes

Original release
- Network: CBC Television
- Release: 27 June 1957 – 23 September 1958

Summertime '57 and Summertime '58 is a Canadian music variety show that aired on CBC Television in 1957 and 1958.

== Premise ==
Bill Walker hosted Summertime '57 with the Jack Kane Orchestra. Summertime '58 featured a more diverse variety of musical guests. The program was a mid-year replacement for Jackie Rae's regular season variety show.

== Scheduling ==
The Summertime series were broadcast in 30-minute time slots.

=== Summertime '57 ===
Summertime '57 was broadcast on Thursdays at 9:30 p.m. (Eastern) from 27 June to 12 September 1957 as follows:

- 27 June 1957: Peter Appleyard, Tommy Hunter, Selma Leeds, The Travellers
- 4 July 1957: Bill Brady Quartet, Don Garrard, Evelyn Gould, Teddi King
- 11 July 1957: Norm Amadio, Joan Fairfax, Anne Marie Moss, Brian Terry
- 18 July 1957: Anne Gable, Larry O'Connor
- 25 July 1957: Peter Appleyard, Tommy Hunter, Selma Leeds, The Travellers
- 1 August 1957: Don Elliott, Joe Niosi (of The Happy Gang), Jimmy Shields, Gino Silvi vocal group, Rosalind Snow
- 8 August 1957: Betty Jean Ferguson, Bernard Johnson, Ellis McClintock, The Playboys
- 15 August 1957: William Charles, Helen Fielding, Wally Koster, Gerry Mulligan Quartet
- 22 August 1957: Teddy Wilson
- 29 August 1957: Betty Jean Ferguson, Don Garrard, Matt Matthews, The Playboys, Joe Puma
- 5 September 1957: Martha Lou Harp
- 12 September 1957: Tony Alamo, Betty Jean Ferguson, Bernard Johnson, Gino Silvi Quintet, Brian Terry

(Jack Kane band were regularly featured on episodes through this season)

=== Summertime '58 ===
Summertime '58 was broadcast Thursdays at 8:00 p.m. from 10 July to 23 September 1958 as follows:

- 10 July 1958: Joe Bushkin, Bobby Gimby, Moe Koffman, Anne Marie Moss
- 17 July 1958: Bill Butler Trio, Helen Fielding
- 24 July 1958: Trump Davidson, Maynard Ferguson, Jack Groob, The Triads
- 31 July 1958: Duke Ellington Quintet, Bobby Gimby, Bert Ninsi Trio, Jean Ramsey
- 7 August 1958: Murray Ginsberg (Dixieland Band), Ann Marie Moss, George Shearing Quintet, Wally Traugott Quartet
- 14 August 1958: Carmen McRae Trio
- 21 August 1958: Bill Butler, Helen Fielding, Jonah Jones Quartet, Jerry Toth
- 28 August 1958: Bobby Gimby, Eddie Heywood, Cliff McKay (jazz), Ann Marie Moss
- 4 September 1958: Ross Culley Group, Margo Lefevre, Modern Jazz Quartet, Billy O'Connor and his Leprecauhns
- 11 September 1958: Tony Bradan Quintet, Dizzy Gillespie Quintet, Ann Marie Moss, Denny Vaughan
- 18 September 1958: Bill Butler, Helen Fielding, The Four Freshmen, Jerry Toth Quintet
- 23 September 1958: Bobby Gimby, Gene Krupa Trio, Ann Marie Moss (season finale)
