= Summer (Claus) =

1893 painting by Emile Claus

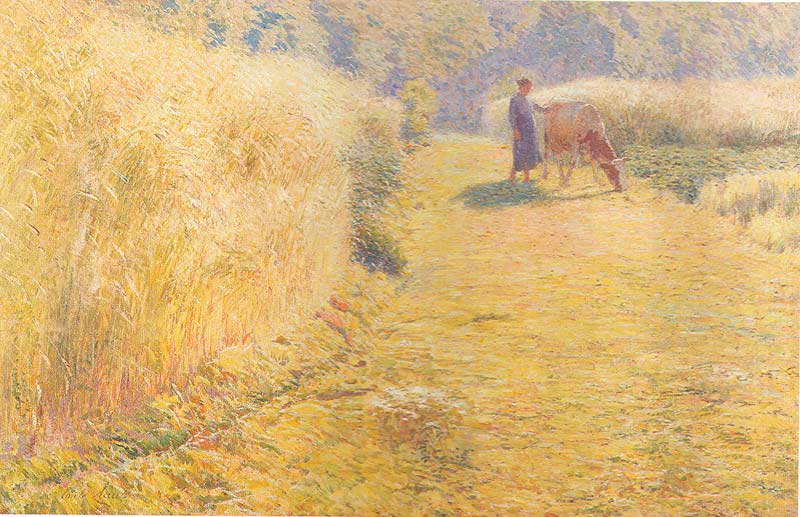

Summer is an 1893 painting by the Flemish painter Emile Claus, now in the Royal Museum of Fine Arts, Antwerp.
