= Summer (Summer Watson album) =

Studio album by Summer Watson
- Released: April 2003
- Genre: Classical
- Label: Sony Classical

Summer is the debut studio album released by British opera soprano Summer Watson in 2003. It reached #2 on the UK classical chart and #1 on the US iTunes charts.

== Production ==
The album was recorded at Abbey Road Studios.

== Track listing ==
1. "Nella Fantasia"
2. "Aranjuez Ma Pensee"
3. "Palabra De Honor"
4. "Berceuse"
5. "Mal Di Luna"
6. "Tutta La Vita"
7. "Sposa Son Disprezzata"
8. "Cantique De Jean Racine"
9. "Morgen"
10. "Fragile"
11. "Song To The Moon"
12. "Cavatina"
