= William Simmers (footballer) =

Scottish footballer

Personal information
- Date of birth: 18 September 1865
- Place of birth: Strathmartine Scotland
- Date of death: 1950 (aged 84–85)
- Position: Defender

Senior career*
Years	Team	Apps	(Gls)
1882	Turton Olympic		
1883	Turton		
1888–1889	Bolton Wanderers	2	(0)
1889	Turton		
- * Club domestic league appearances and goals

William Simmers (18 September 1865 – 1950) was a Scottish footballer who played in The Football League for Bolton Wanderers.

William Simmers was born in Strathmartine, Scotland on 18 September 1865, however his football career, as far as is known, was played in England. Simmers came South as a youth, aged 17, and signed for Turton Olympic. After one year Simmers moved to Turton, a much bigger club.

William Simmers, playing at centre–half, made his Bolton Wanderers and League debut on 29 September 1888, at Pike's Lane, the then home of Bolton Wanderers. The visitors were Everton and the home team won 6–2. Simmers appeared in two of the 22 League matches played by Bolton Wanderers in season 1888–89.

Simmers played three times for Bolton Wanderers (two League and one FA Cup) and left Bolton and returned to Turton in 1889.
