= Summer XO =

American singer-songwriter (born 1978)

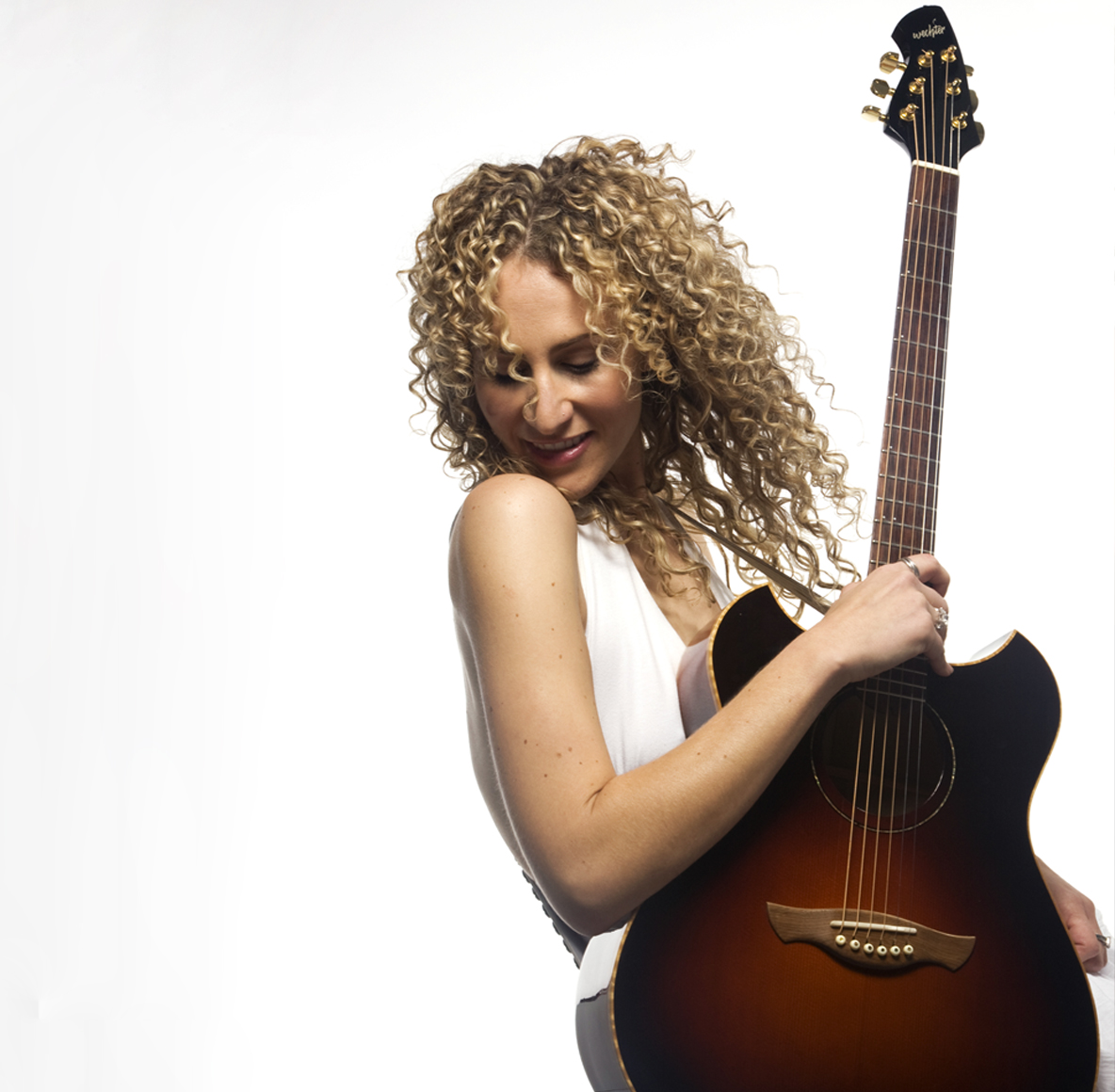
- Summer XO with one of her Wechter Pathmaker guitars

Background information
- Born: Summer Esso; August 12, 1978 (age 48)
- Genres: Pop, Indie pop
- Occupations: Musician, songwriter, visual artist
- Instruments: Vocal, guitar, keyboards, ukulele
- Years active: 2006–present
- Website: summerxo.com

Summer Esso, known professionally as Summer XO (born August 12, 1978) is a Los Angeles–based American singer-songwriter who plays guitar, piano, and ukulele. Though not her primary focus, she is also a visual artist who creates poster-size pastel drawings of abstract emotive female faces.

== Early life ==
Originally from West Virginia, Summer XO is the eldest of five children, and spent most of her youth in the small town of Bridgeport, West Virginia. Her father is an engineer and her mother is a homemaker.

== Career ==
Summer XO releases songs and music videos. She ran a successful Kickstarter campaign to raise funds to release an EP, titled, "Hello World." This EP was released in late 2016, but she released each song as individual singles, beginning June 2015. The order of releases, "That One Thing," "It Would Last," and "Usually." Half the songs were produced by producer Mikal Blue, who is best known for his work on Colbie Caillat's "Coco."

Before renaming herself and securing the US Trademark for Summer XO in 2013, she performed as and held the trademark for the name "Summer."

In June 2013, she released the song "Invented The Word", which was accompanied by an official music video. It was produced by Henry Strange and Uri Djemal.

In August 2012, Summer digitally released a cover version of the Cyndi Lauper song, "True Colors", produced by Henry Strange and Jess Stroup.

Summer released the album Timing And Lighting on LossLess Records in September 2008. It was produced by Henry Strange, with the exception of the song, "Messed Up," which was produced by Jess Stroup.

In October 2006, Summer was recognized as one of the "Top Ten Songwriters of 2006" by the Portland Songwriting Association.

Summer XO exclusively plays handmade Wechter brand acoustic guitars that have a visually unique double cutaway body style. She owns three Wechter Pathmaker Elite series. She often performs with all three on stage because of her use of different guitar tunings.

== Visual art biography ==
Summer XO also releases a series of pastel drawings of abstract female faces that depict a clear emotion. She sells them online through her online store/. Due to the subject matter, Summer XO refers to the pieces in this series as "The Girls." She also often displays her drawings on stage during music performances.

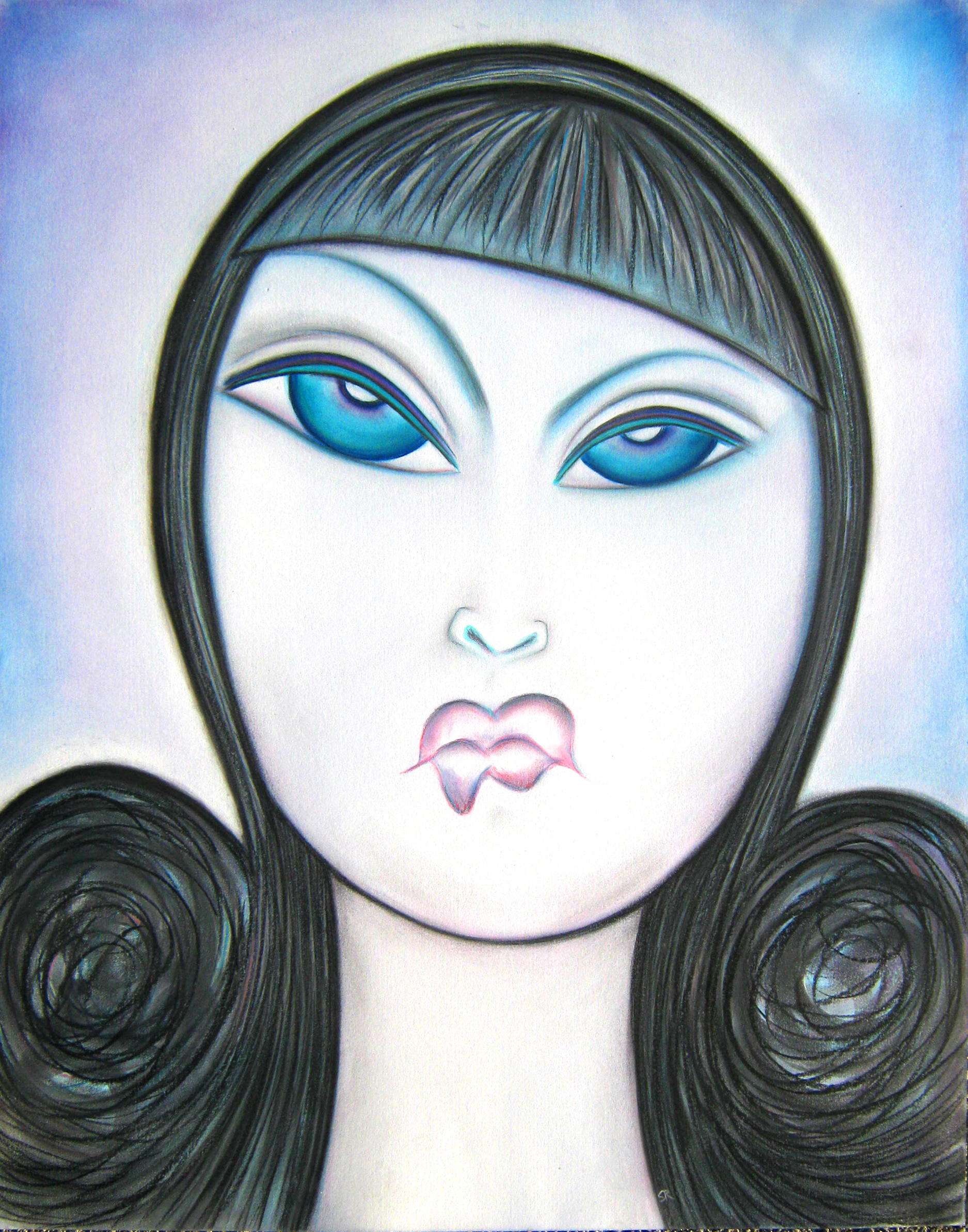
"Francesca" Painting by Summer, 2009

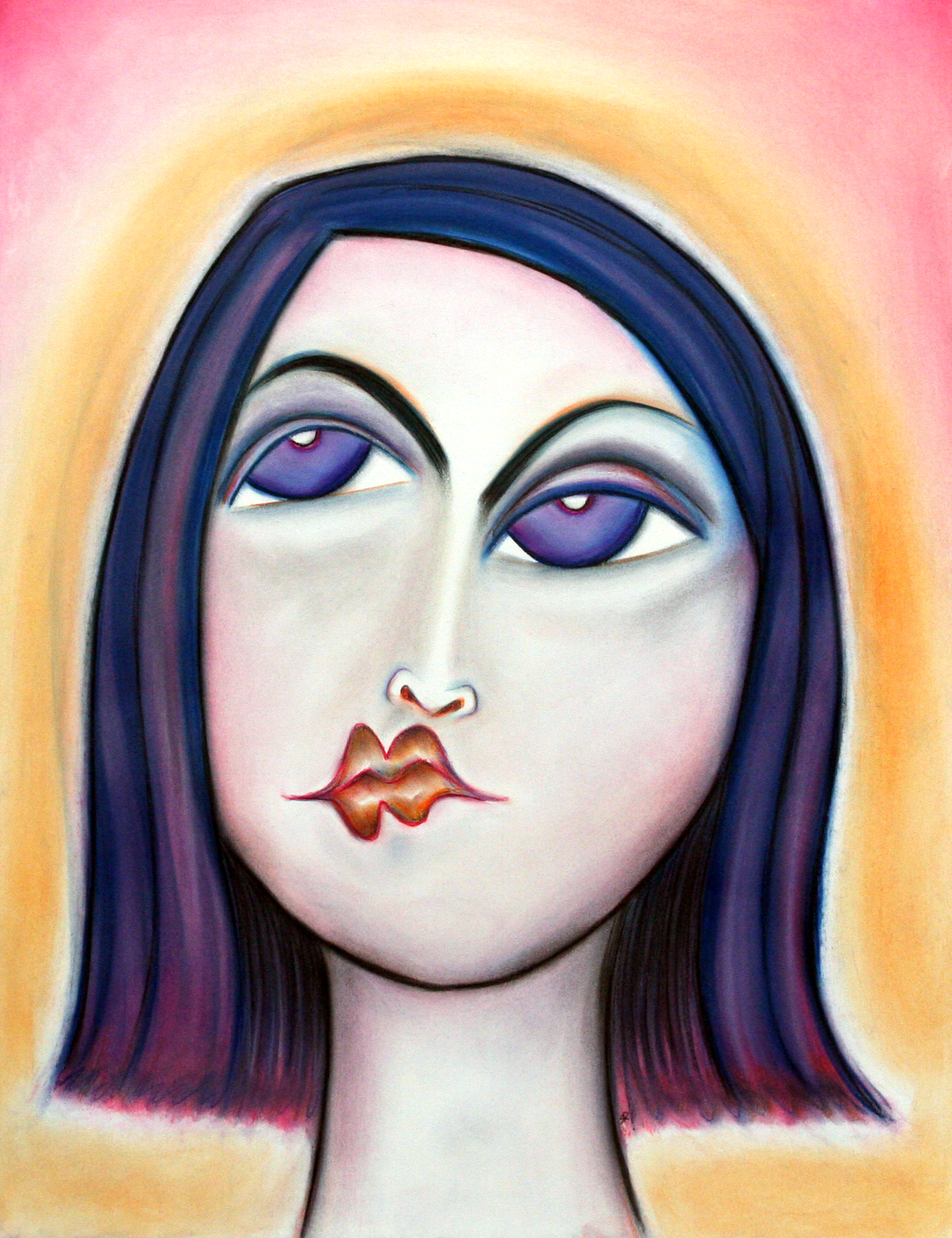
"Perdita" Painting by Summer, 2008

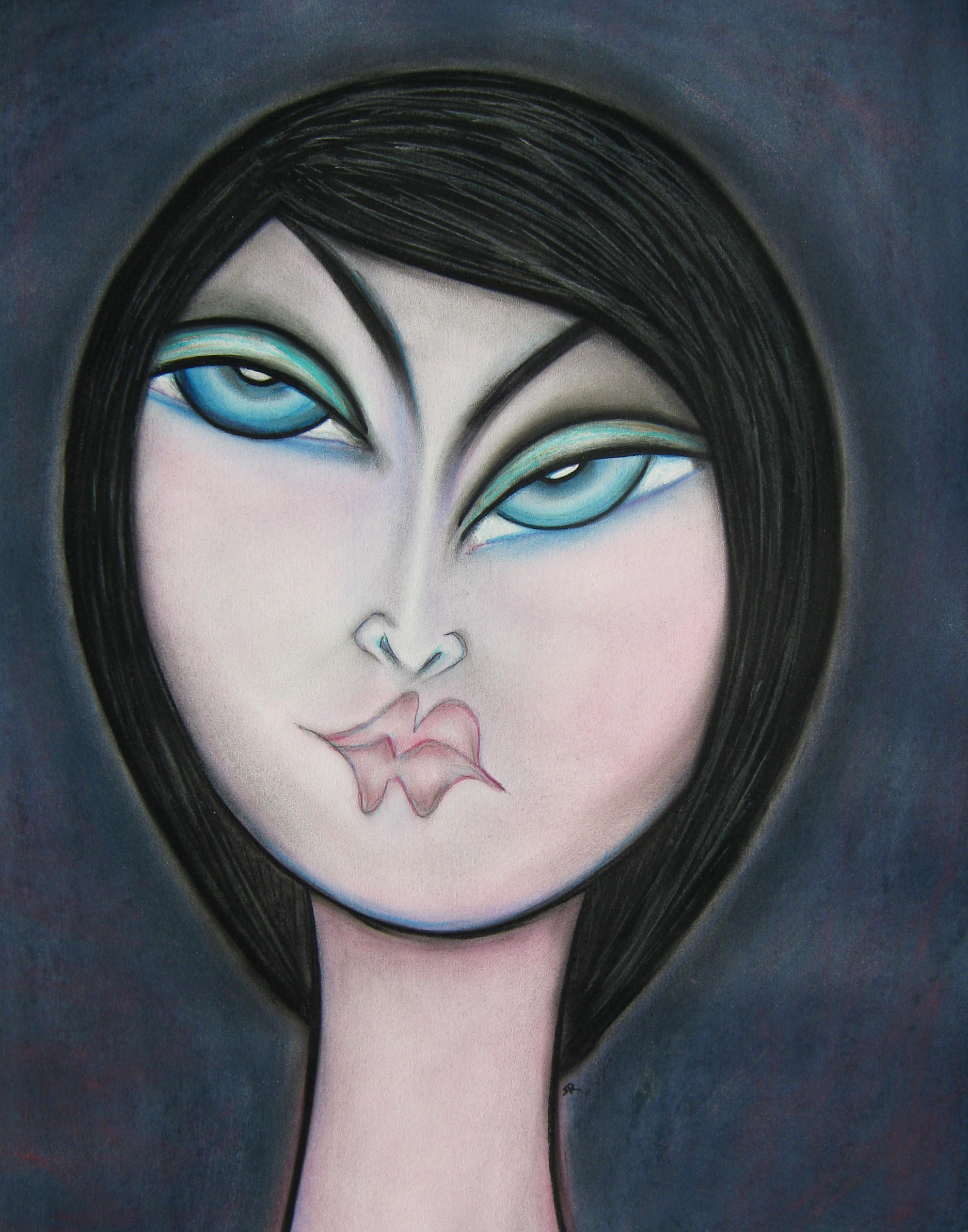
"Sophia" Painting by Summer, 2009

== Personal life ==
The 6' tall Summer XO took up residence in Tampa, Florida, Aix-En-Provence, France, Los Angeles, Philadelphia, Chicago, Portland, Oregon, Miami, and Paris, France. Summer XO moved to her current residence in Los Angeles, in March 2013. From December 2011 to January 2013, Summer XO lived in Paris, France. While there, she busked in the Paris metro and played live shows. Her marital status as of 2018 is unmarried and she has no children.

== Discography ==
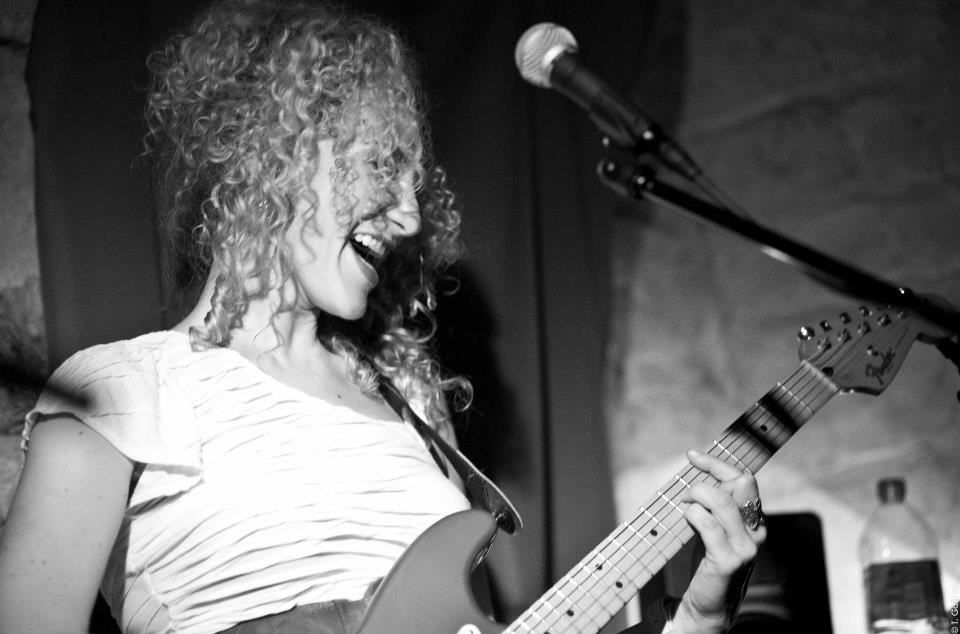
Summer XO Performing in Paris in July 2012

=== Albums ===
- Hello World EP (2016)
- Timing and Lighting (2008) on LossLess Records

=== Singles ===
- "Usually" (2016)
- "It Would Last" (2016)
- "That One Thing" (2015)
- "Invented The Word" (2013)
- "True Colors" (2012)
