= Summer (surname) =

Summer is a surname, and it may refer to:

- Cree Summer (born 1969), Canadian-American actress
- Donna Summer (1948–2012), American singer and songwriter
- Edward Summer (1946–2014), American artist, filmmaker and writer
- India Summer (born 1975), American pornographic actress
- Mark Summer (born 1958), American jazz cellist

== See also ==
- Sommer, a surname
- Summer (given name)
- Summers (surname)
- Sumner (surname)
