= Behavioral neuroscience =

Study of the neural mechanisms of behaviour

Behavioral neuroscience, also known as biological psychology, biopsychology, or psychobiology, is part of the broad, interdisciplinary field of neuroscience, with its primary focus being on the biological and neural substrates underlying human experiences and behaviors, as in our psychology. Derived from an earlier field known as physiological psychology, behavioral neuroscience applies the principles of biology to study the physiological, genetic, and developmental mechanisms of behavior in humans and other animals.

Behavioral neuroscientists examine the biological bases of behavior through research that involves neuroanatomical substrates, environmental and genetic factors, effects of lesions and electrical stimulation, developmental processes, recording electrical activity, neurotransmitters, hormonal influences, chemical components, and the effects of drugs. Important topics of consideration for neuroscientific research in behavior include learning and memory, sensory processes, motivation and emotion, as well as genetic and molecular substrates concerning the biological bases of behavior. Subdivisions of behavioral neuroscience include the field of cognitive neuroscience, which emphasizes the biological processes underlying human cognition. Behavioral and cognitive neuroscience are both concerned with the neuronal and biological bases of psychology, with a particular emphasis on either cognition or behavior depending on the field.

== History ==
Behavioral neuroscience as a scientific discipline emerged from a variety of scientific and philosophical traditions in the 18th and 19th centuries. René Descartes proposed physical models to explain animal as well as human behavior. Descartes suggested that the pineal gland, a midline unpaired structure in the brain of many organisms, was the point of contact between mind and body. Descartes also elaborated on a theory in which the pneumatics of bodily fluids could explain reflexes and other motor behavior. This theory was inspired by moving statues in a garden in Paris.

Other philosophers also helped give birth to psychology. One of the earliest textbooks in the new field, The Principles of Psychology by William James, argues that the scientific study of psychology should be grounded in an understanding of biology.

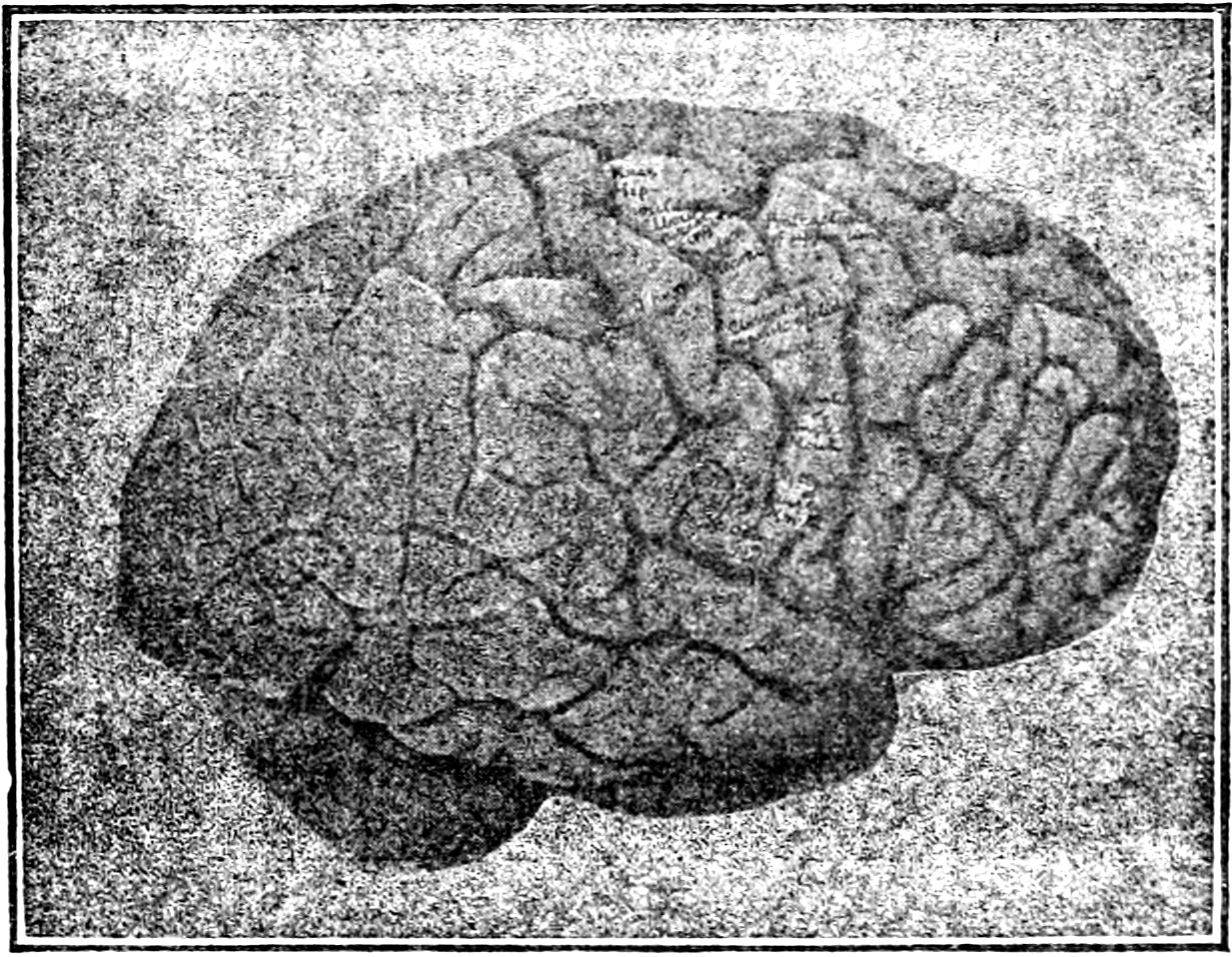
1907 image of a brain

The emergence of psychology and behavioral neuroscience as legitimate sciences can be traced from the emergence of physiology from anatomy, particularly neuroanatomy. Physiologists conducted experiments on living organisms, a practice that was distrusted by the dominant anatomists of the 18th and 19th centuries. The influential work of Claude Bernard, Charles Bell, and William Harvey helped to convince the scientific community that reliable data could be obtained from living subjects.

Even before the 18th and 19th centuries, behavioral neuroscience was beginning to take form as far back as 1700 B.C. The question that seems to continually arise is: what is the connection between the mind and body? The debate is formally referred to as the mind-body problem. There are two major schools of thought that attempt to resolve the mind–body problem; monism and dualism. Plato and Aristotle are two of several philosophers who participated in this debate. Plato believed that the brain was where all mental thought and processes happened. In contrast, Aristotle believed the brain served the purpose of cooling down the emotions derived from the heart. The mind-body problem was a stepping stone toward attempting to understand the connection between the mind and body.

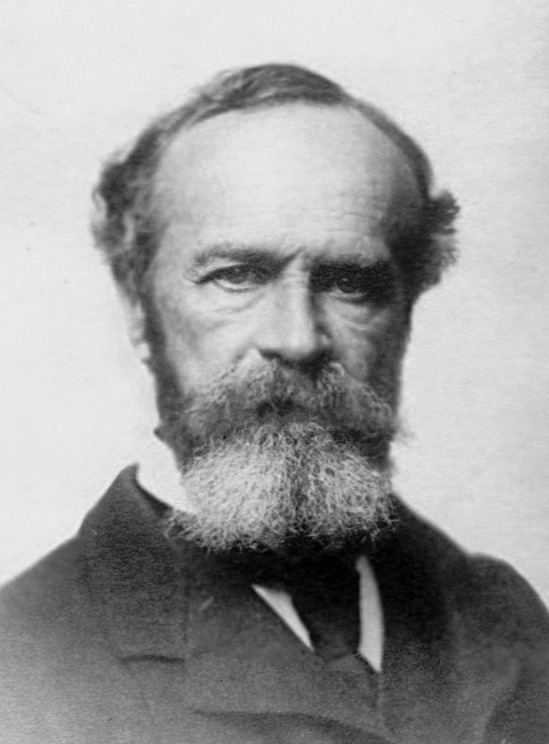
William James

Another debate arose about localization of function or functional specialization versus equipotentiality which played a significant role in the development in behavioral neuroscience. As a result of localization of function research, many famous people found within psychology have come to various different conclusions. Wilder Penfield was able to develop a map of the cerebral cortex through studying epileptic patients along with Rassmussen. Research on localization of function has led behavioral neuroscientists to a better understanding of which parts of the brain control behavior. This is best exemplified through the case study of Phineas Gage.

The term "psychobiology" has been used in a variety of contexts, emphasizing the importance of biology, which is the discipline that studies organic, neural and cellular modifications in behavior, plasticity in neuroscience, and biological diseases in all aspects, in addition, biology focuses and analyzes behavior and all the subjects it is concerned about, from a scientific point of view. In this context, psychology helps as a complementary, but important discipline in the neurobiological sciences. The role of psychology in this questions is that of a social tool that backs up the main or strongest biological science. The term "psychobiology" was first used in its modern sense by Knight Dunlap in his book An Outline of Psychobiology (1914). Dunlap also was the founder and editor-in-chief of the journal Psychobiology. In the announcement of that journal, Dunlap writes that the journal will publish research "...bearing on the interconnection of mental and physiological functions", which describes the field of behavioral neuroscience even in its modern sense.

In relation to the discipline, Solomon Carter Fuller (1872 – 1953) also aided in the advancement of neurology and psychology with his Alzheimer's research. Dr. Fuller was the first African American psychiatrist and one of the pioneers of Alzheimer's disease. In 1904, Dr. Fuller began working as a research assistant under the founder of Alzheimer's disease, Alois Alzheimer, studying presenile dementia. Later in 1912, Dr. Fuller published the first review on Alzheimer's disease that included information regarding his patient who was the 9th person to ever be diagnosed with the disease. During his time as a researcher and doctor, he worked with black veterans to prevent them from getting misdiagnosed and deemed ineligible for military benefits; he also trained staff to diagnose side effects from sexually transmitted infections. In 1969, an award was established by the American Psychiatric Association called the Solomon Carter Fuller Award to honor black pioneers who worked to help other black people.

Neuroscience is considered a relatively new discipline, with the first conference for the Society of Neuroscience occurring in 1971. The meeting was held to merge different fields focused on studying the nervous system (ex. neuroanatomy, neurochemistry, physiological psychology, neuroendocrinology, clinical neurology, neurophysiology, neuropharmacology, etc.) by creating one interdisciplinary field. In 1983, the Journal of Comparative and Physiological Psychology, published by the American Psychological Association, was split into two separate journals: Behavioral Neuroscience and the Journal of Comparative Psychology. The author of the journal at the time gave reasoning for this separation, with one being that behavioral neuroscience is the broader contemporary advancement of physiological psychology. Furthermore, in all animals, the nervous system is the organ of behavior. Therefore, every biological and behavioral variable that influences behavior must go through the nervous system to do so. Present-day research in behavioral neuroscience studies all biological variables which act through the nervous system and relate to behavior.

== Relationship to other fields of psychology and biology ==
In many cases, humans may serve as experimental subjects in behavioral neuroscience experiments; however, a great deal of the experimental literature in behavioral neuroscience comes from the study of non-human species, most frequently rats, mice, and monkeys. As a result, a critical assumption in behavioral neuroscience is that organisms share biological and behavioral similarities, enough to permit extrapolations across species. This allies behavioral neuroscience closely with comparative psychology, ethology, evolutionary biology, and neurobiology. Behavioral neuroscience also has paradigmatic and methodological similarities to neuropsychology, which relies heavily on the study of the behavior of humans with nervous system dysfunction (i.e., a non-experimentally based biological manipulation).

== Research methods ==
The distinguishing characteristic of a behavioral neuroscience experiment is that either the independent variable of the experiment is biological, or some dependent variable is biological. In other words, the nervous system of the organism under study is permanently or temporarily altered, or some aspect of the nervous system is measured (usually to be related to a behavioral variable).

=== Disabling or decreasing neural function ===
- Lesions – A classic method in which a brain-region of interest is naturally or intentionally destroyed to observe any resulting changes such as degraded or enhanced performance on some behavioral measure. Lesions can be placed with relatively high accuracy "Thanks to a variety of brain 'atlases' which provide a map of brain regions in 3-dimensional" stereotactic coordinates.
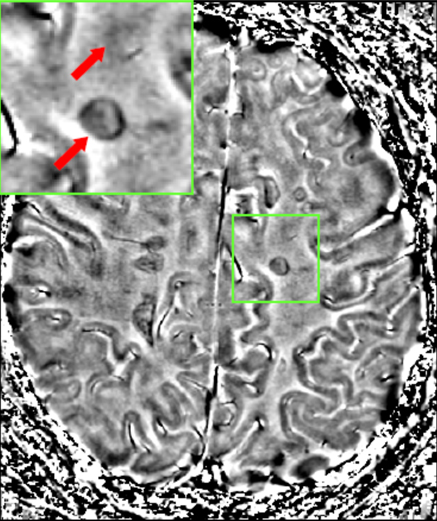
  The part of the picture emphasized shows the lesion in the brain. This type of lesion can be removed through surgery.
  - Surgical lesions – Neural tissue is destroyed by removing it surgically.
  - Electrolytic lesions – Neural tissue is destroyed through the application of electrical shock trauma.
  - Chemical lesions – Neural tissue is destroyed by the infusion of a neurotoxin.
  - Temporary lesions – Neural tissue is temporarily disabled by cooling or by the use of anesthetics such as tetrodotoxin.
- Transcranial magnetic stimulation – A new technique usually used with human subjects in which a magnetic coil applied to the scalp causes unsystematic electrical activity in nearby cortical neurons which can be experimentally analyzed as a functional lesion.
- Synthetic ligand injection – A receptor activated solely by a synthetic ligand (RASSL) or Designer Receptor Exclusively Activated by Designer Drugs (DREADD), permits spatial and temporal control of G protein signaling in vivo. These systems utilize G protein-coupled receptors (GPCR) engineered to respond exclusively to synthetic small molecules ligands, like clozapine N-oxide (CNO), and not to their natural ligand(s). RASSL's represent a GPCR-based chemogenetic tool. These synthetic ligands upon activation can decrease neural function by G-protein activation. This can with Potassium attenuating neural activity.
- Optogenetic inhibition – A light activated inhibitory protein is expressed in cells of interest. Powerful millisecond timescale neuronal inhibition is instigated upon stimulation by the appropriate frequency of light delivered via fiber optics or implanted LEDs in the case of vertebrates, or via external illumination for small, sufficiently translucent invertebrates. Bacterial Halorhodopsins or Proton pumps are the two classes of proteins used for inhibitory optogenetics, achieving inhibition by increasing cytoplasmic levels of halides (Cl^{−}) or decreasing the cytoplasmic concentration of protons, respectively.

=== Enhancing neural function ===
- Electrical stimulation – A classic method in which neural activity is enhanced by application of a small electric current (too small to cause significant cell death).
- Psychopharmacological manipulations – A chemical receptor antagonist induces neural activity by interfering with neurotransmission. Antagonists can be delivered systemically (such as by intravenous injection) or locally (intracerebrally) during a surgical procedure into the ventricles or into specific brain structures. For example, NMDA antagonist AP5 has been shown to inhibit the initiation of long term potentiation of excitatory synaptic transmission (in rodent fear conditioning) which is believed to be a vital mechanism in learning and memory.
- Synthetic Ligand Injection – Likewise, G_{q}-DREADDs can be used to modulate cellular function by innervation of brain regions such as Hippocampus. This innervation results in the amplification of γ-rhythms, which increases motor activity.
- Transcranial magnetic stimulation – In some cases (for example, studies of motor cortex), this technique can be analyzed as having a stimulatory effect (rather than as a functional lesion).
- Optogenetic excitation – A light activated excitatory protein is expressed in select cells. Channelrhodopsin-2 (ChR2), a light activated cation channel, was the first bacterial opsin shown to excite neurons in response to light, though a number of new excitatory optogenetic tools have now been generated by improving and imparting novel properties to ChR2.

=== Measuring neural activity ===
- Optical techniques – Optical methods for recording neuronal activity rely on methods that modify the optical properties of neurons in response to the cellular events associated with action potentials or neurotransmitter release.
  - Voltage sensitive dyes (VSDs) were among the earliest method for optically detecting neuronal activity. VSDs commonly changed their fluorescent properties in response to a voltage change across the neuron's membrane, rendering membrane sub-threshold and supra-threshold (action potentials) electrical activity detectable. Genetically encoded voltage sensitive fluorescent proteins have also been developed.
  - Calcium imaging relies on dyes or genetically encoded proteins that fluoresce upon binding to the calcium that is transiently present during an action potential.
  - Synapto-pHluorin is a technique that relies on a fusion protein that combines a synaptic vesicle membrane protein and a pH sensitive fluorescent protein. Upon synaptic vesicle release, the chimeric protein is exposed to the higher pH of the synaptic cleft, causing a measurable change in fluorescence.
- Single-unit recording – A method whereby an electrode is introduced into the brain of a living animal to detect electrical activity that is generated by the neurons adjacent to the electrode tip. Normally this is performed with sedated animals but sometimes it is performed on awake animals engaged in a behavioral event, such as a thirsty rat whisking a particular sandpaper grade previously paired with water in order to measure the corresponding patterns of neuronal firing at the decision point.
- Multielectrode recording – The use of a bundle of fine electrodes to record the simultaneous activity of up to hundreds of neurons.
- Functional magnetic resonance imaging – fMRI, a technique most frequently applied on human subjects, in which changes in cerebral blood flow can be detected in an MRI apparatus and are taken to indicate relative activity of larger scale brain regions (i.e., on the order of hundreds of thousands of neurons).
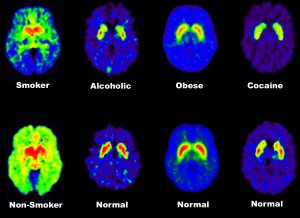
- PET brain scans can show chemical differences in the brain between addicts and non-addicts. The normal images in the bottom row come from non-addicts while people with addictions have scans that look more abnormal.
  Positron emission tomography - PET detects particles called photons using a 3-D nuclear medicine examination. These particles are emitted by injections of radioisotopes such as fluorine. PET imaging reveal the pathological processes which predict anatomic changes making it important for detecting, diagnosing and characterising many pathologies.
- Electroencephalography – EEG, and the derivative technique of event-related potentials, in which scalp electrodes monitor the average activity of neurons in the cortex (again, used most frequently with human subjects). This technique uses different types of electrodes for recording systems such as needle electrodes and saline-based electrodes. EEG allows for the investigation of mental disorders, sleep disorders and physiology. It can monitor brain development and cognitive engagement.
- Electrocorticography – ECoG, similar to an EGG, the ECoG records the brains electrical activity and is commonly used on patients to monitor and evaluate epilepsy or seizures. However, the ECoG is an invasive medical procedure that measures signals directly from the brains surface. The ECoG provides high spatial and temporal resolution as opposed to its non-invasive counterpart, the EEG which has low temporal and spatial resolution. Due to the invasiveness of the procedure, the data for human patients is harder to collect than a standard EEG assessment.
- Functional neuroanatomy – A more complex counterpart of phrenology. The expression of some anatomical marker is taken to reflect neural activity. For example, the expression of immediate early genes is thought to be caused by vigorous neural activity. Likewise, the injection of 2-deoxyglucose prior to some behavioral task can be followed by anatomical localization of that chemical; it is taken up by neurons that are electrically active.
- Magnetoencephalography – MEG shows the functioning of the human brain through the measurement of electromagnetic activity. Measuring the magnetic fields created by the electric current flowing within the neurons identifies brain activity associated with various human functions in real time, with millimeter spatial accuracy. Clinicians can noninvasively obtain data to help them assess neurological disorders and plan surgical treatments.

=== Genetic techniques ===
- QTL mapping – The influence of a gene in some behavior can be statistically inferred by studying inbred strains of some species, most commonly mice. The recent sequencing of the genome of many species, most notably mice, has facilitated this technique.
- Selective breeding – Organisms, often mice, may be bred selectively among inbred strains to create a recombinant congenic strain. This might be done to isolate an experimentally interesting stretch of DNA derived from one strain on the background genome of another strain to allow stronger inferences about the role of that stretch of DNA.
- Genetic engineering – The genome may also be experimentally-manipulated; for example, knockout mice can be engineered to lack a particular gene, or a gene may be expressed in a strain which does not normally do so (the 'transgenic'). Advanced techniques may also permit the expression or suppression of a gene to occur by injection of some regulating chemical.

=== Quantifying behavior ===
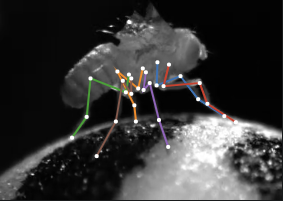
- Fruit fly (Drosophila melanogaster) leg joints being tracked in 3D with Anipose.
  Markerless pose estimation – The advancement of computer vision techniques in recent years have allowed for precise quantifications of animal movements without needing to fit physical markers onto the subject. On high-speed video captured in a behavioral assay, keypoints from the subject can be extracted frame-by-frame, which is often useful to analyze in tandem with neural recordings/manipulations. Analyses can be conducted on how keypoints (i.e. parts of the animal) move within different phases of a particular behavior (on a short timescale), or throughout an animal's behavioral repertoire (longer timescale). These keypoint changes can be compared with corresponding changes in neural activity. A machine learning approach can also be used to identify specific behaviors (e.g. forward walking, turning, grooming, courtship, etc.), and quantify the dynamics of transitions between behaviors.

== Other research methods ==
Computational models - Using a computer to formulate real-world problems to develop solutions. Although this method is often focused in computer science, it has begun to move towards other areas of study. For example, psychology is one of these areas. Computational models allow researchers in psychology to enhance their understanding of the functions and developments in nervous systems. Examples of methods include the modelling of neurons, networks and brain systems and theoretical analysis. Computational methods have a wide variety of roles including clarifying experiments, hypothesis testing and generating new insights. These techniques play an increasing role in the advancement of biological psychology.

=== Limitations and advantages ===
Different manipulations have advantages and limitations. Neural tissue destroyed as a primary consequence of a surgery, electric shock or neurotoxin can confound the results so that the physical trauma masks changes in the fundamental neurophysiological processes of interest. For example, when using an electrolytic probe to create a purposeful lesion in a distinct region of the rat brain, surrounding tissue can be affected: so, a change in behavior exhibited by the experimental group post-surgery is to some degree a result of damage to surrounding neural tissue, rather than by a lesion of a distinct brain region. Most genetic manipulation techniques are also considered permanent. Temporary lesions can be achieved with advanced in genetic manipulations, for example, certain genes can now be switched on and off with diet. Pharmacological manipulations also allow blocking of certain neurotransmitters temporarily as the function returns to its previous state after the drug has been metabolized.

== Topic areas ==
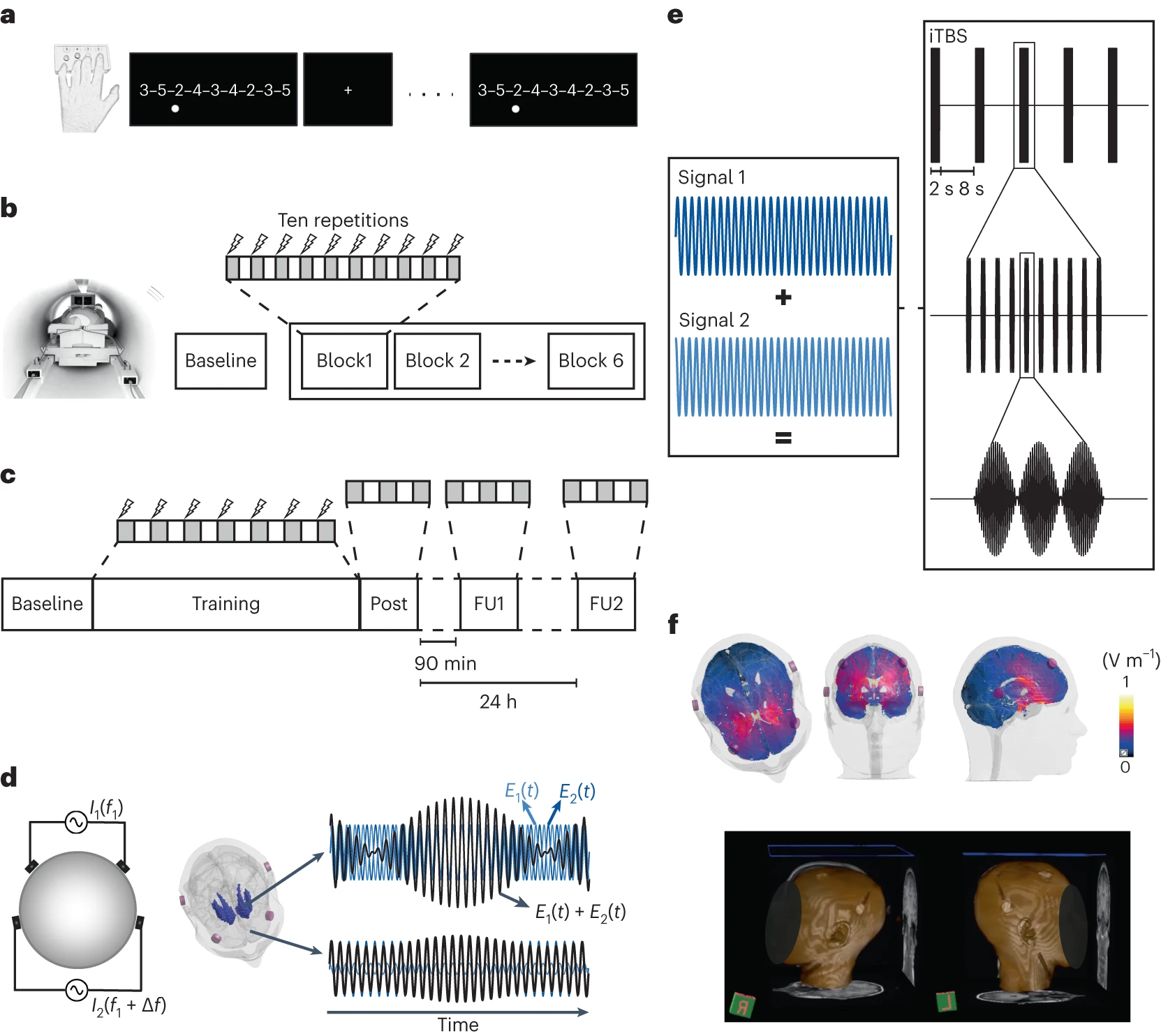
Experimental setup for noninvasive theta-burst stimulation of the human striatum to enhance striatal activity and motor skill learning.

In general, behavioral neuroscientists study various neuronal and biological processes underlying behavior, though limited by the need to use nonhuman animals. As a result, the bulk of literature in behavioral neuroscience deals with experiences and mental processes that are shared across different animal models such as:

- Sensation and perception
- Motivated behavior (hunger, thirst, sex)
- Control of movement
- Learning and memory
- Sleep and biological rhythms
- Emotion

However, with increasing technical sophistication and with the development of more precise noninvasive methods that can be applied to human subjects, behavioral neuroscientists are beginning to contribute to other classical topic areas of psychology, philosophy, and linguistics, such as:

- Language
- Reasoning and decision making
- Consciousness

Behavioral neuroscience has also had a strong history of contributing to the understanding of medical disorders, including those that fall under the purview of clinical psychology, clinical neuropsychology, and biological psychopathology (also known as abnormal psychology). Although animal models do not exist for all mental illnesses, the field has contributed important therapeutic data on a variety of conditions, including:

- Parkinson's disease, a degenerative disorder of the central nervous system that often impairs motor skills and speech.
- Huntington's disease, a rare inherited neurological disorder whose most obvious symptoms are abnormal body movements and a lack of coordination. It also affects a number of mental abilities and some aspects of personality.
- Alzheimer's disease, a neurodegenerative disease that, in its most common form, is found in people over the age of 65 and is characterized by progressive cognitive deterioration, together with declining activities of daily living and by neuropsychiatric symptoms or behavioral changes.
- Clinical depression, a common psychiatric disorder, characterized by a persistent lowering of mood, loss of interest in usual activities and diminished ability to experience pleasure.
- Schizophrenia, a psychiatric diagnosis that describes a mental illness characterized by impairments in the perception or expression of reality, most commonly manifesting as auditory hallucinations, paranoid or bizarre delusions or disorganized speech and thinking in the context of significant social or occupational dysfunction.
- Autism, a brain development disorder that impairs social interaction and communication, and causes restricted and repetitive behavior, all starting before a child is three years old. However, neuropsychologist, which are individuals in a behavioral neuroscience subfield have used mindfulness interventions to combat socially disruptive behaviors in autistic children.
- Anxiety, a physiological state characterized by cognitive, somatic, emotional, and behavioral components. These components combine to create the feelings that are typically recognized as fear, apprehension, or worry.
- Drug abuse, a chronic behavioral disorder in which individuals seek reward and pleasure reinforcement through uncontrollable drug use.
- Alcoholism, a behavioral disorder in which individuals compulsively consume alcoholic substances. This disorder can result in several medical, neurological, and psychiatric conditions.

=== Research on topic areas ===
==== Cognition ====
High resolution fMRI of the human brain.

Behavioral neuroscientists conduct research on various cognitive processes through the use of different neuroimaging techniques. Examples of cognitive research might involve examination of neural correlates during emotional information processing, such as one study that analyzed the relationship between subjective affect and neural reactivity during sustained processing of positive (savoring) and negative (rumination) emotion. The aim of the study was to analyze whether repetitive positive thinking (seen as being beneficial) and repetitive negative thinking (significantly related to worse mental health) would have similar underlying neural mechanisms. Researchers found that the individuals who had a more intense positive affect during savoring, were also the same individuals who had a more intense negative affect during rumination. fMRI data showed similar activations in brain regions during both rumination and savoring, suggesting shared neural mechanisms between the two types of repetitive thinking. The results of the study suggest there are similarities, both subjectively and mechanistically, with repetitive thinking about positive and negative emotions. This overall suggests shared neural mechanisms by which sustained emotional processing of both positive and negative information occurs.

==== Stress ====
Research within the field of behavioral neuroscience involves looking at the complex neuroanatomy underlying different emotional processes, such as stress. Godoy et al. (2018) did so by providing an in-depth analyzation of the neurobiological underpinnings of the stress response. The article features on an overview on the historical development of stress research and its importance leading up to research related to both physical and psychological stressors today. The authors explored various significators of stress and their corresponding neuroanatomical processing, along with the temporal dynamics of both acute and chronic stress and its effects on the brain. Overall, the article provides a comprehensive scientific overview of stress through a neurobiological lens, highlighting the importance of our current knowledge in stress-related research areas today.

===== Sensation and Perception =====
Another common research topic within behavioral neuroscience is sensation and perception. Wu et al. (2023) conducted a study that analyzed auditory and somatosensory realms association with psychosocial factors (e.g., depression) and cognitive impairment among the geriatric population. The article discussed how hearing loss is the most common form of sensory dysfunction within the geriatric population as 2.5 billion people will experience this type of sensory depletion. The researchers used the Chinese version Mini-Mental State Examination (MMSE), Nottingham Sensory Assessment scale (NSA), Albert's test, Geriatric Depression Scale-30, and the Lubben Social network Scale-6 (LSNS-6) to assess cognitive function, sensation, perception, and negative socio-psychological factors (i.e., depression and social isolation), respectively. After performing a statistical analysis based on the participants assessment scores it was found that older people with auditorial sensory loss, atypical perception, and depression are more at risk for cognitive impairment. However, implications such as rehabilitation, non-pharmacological interventions for sensory loss and depression may reduce the amount of cognitive impairment older adults experience.

== Awards ==
Nobel Laureates

The following Nobel Prize winners could reasonably be considered behavioral neuroscientists or neurobiologists. (This list omits winners who were almost exclusively neuroanatomists or neurophysiologists; i.e., those that did not measure behavioral or neurobiological variables.)

- Charles Sherrington (1932)
- Edgar Adrian (1932)
- Walter Hess (1949)
- Egas Moniz (1949)
- Georg von Békésy (1961)
- George Wald (1967)
- Ragnar Granit (1967)
- Konrad Lorenz (1973)
- Niko Tinbergen (1973)
- Karl von Frisch (1973)
- Roger W. Sperry (1981)
- David H. Hubel (1981)
- Torsten N. Wiesel (1981)
- Eric R. Kandel (2000)
- Arvid Carlsson (2000)
- Richard Axel (2004)
- Linda B. Buck (2004)
- John O'Keefe (2014)
- Edvard Moser (2014)
- May-Britt Moser (2014)

Kavli Prize in Neuroscience

- Ann Graybiel (1942)
- Winfried Denk (1957)
- Cornelia Bargmann (1961)

== See also ==
- Affective neuroscience
- Behavioral genetics
- Biological psychiatry
- Biology
- Biosemiotics
- Cognitive neuroscience
- Developmental psychobiology
- Epigenetics in psychology
- Evolutionary psychology
- Models of abnormality
- Neurobiology
- Neuroethology
- Neuroscience
- Outline of brain mapping
- Outline of psychology
- Outline of the human brain
- Physical anthropology
- Psychoneuroimmunology
- Psychopharmacology
- Psychophysics
- Social neuroscience
- Zoosemiotics
