= Sommer =

Sommer is a surname, from the German, Anglo-Saxon and Scandinavian languages word for the season "summer".

Notable people with this name include:

== A–L ==
- Alfred Sommer (born 1943), American academic
- Alice Herz-Sommer (1903–2014), Czech-born Jewish pianist, oldest Holocaust survivor
- António de Sommer Champalimaud (1918–2004), Portuguese banker and industrialist
- Bert Sommer (1949–1990), American musician and actor
- Christine Sommer (born 1970), Austrian actress
- Clifford C. Sommer (1908–1993), American businessman and politician
- Coleen Sommer (born 1960), American high jumper
- Daniel Sommer (1850–1940), American religious leader, prominent in the Restoration Movement
- Daniela Sommer (born 1978), German politician
- Édouard Sommer (1822–1866), French scholar
- Elke Sommer (1940-2026), German actress
- Erik Sommer (born 1978), American artist
- Evrim Sommer (born 1971), German politician
- Frederick Sommer (1905–1999), Italian-born American photographer
- Gerhard Sommer (1921–2019), German Nazi officer accused of war crimes
- Giorgio Sommer (1834–1914), German photographer
- Günter Sommer (born 1943), German jazz musician
- Hans Sommer (SS officer) (1914–1987), German Nazi officer (SS-Obersturmführer)
- Hans Sommer (composer) (1837–1922), German opera composer
- Hans Sommer (composer, born 1904) (1904–2000), German film music composer
- Iris Sommer (born 1970), Dutch psychiatrist
- Jason Sommer, American poet and academic
- Joe Sommer (1858–1938), American baseball player
- Josef Sommer (born 1934), American film actor
- Johann Wilhelm Ernst Sommer (1881–1952), German Methodist bishop
- Juergen Sommer (born 1969), American soccer player
- Keith P. Sommer (born 1946), American politician
- Kévin Sommer (born 1989), French footballer
- Kostas Sommer (born 1975), Greek actor
- Luke Elliott Sommer (born 1986), American soldier and bank robber

== M–Z ==
- Manfred Sommer (1933–2007), Spanish comics creator
- Michael Sommer (1952–2025), German trade unionist leader
- Mike Sommer (1934–2022), American football player
- Peter Sommer, Danish singer-songwriter
- Peter Sommer (director), British archaeologist
- Petr Sommer, Czech archaeologist
- Ralf J. Sommer, German biologist specializing in evolutionary developmental biology
- Ralph Frederick Sommer (1898–1971), American dentist, one of the endodontics pioneers
- Raymond Sommer (1906–1950), French racing driver
- Renate Sommer (born 1958), German politician
- Rich Sommer (born 1978), American actor
- Robert Sommer (1929–2021), American psychologist
- Robert Sommer (psychiatrist) (1864–1937), German psychiatrist and genealogist
- Roger Sommer (aviator), French aviator
- Roy Sommer (born 1957), American ice hockey player
- Scott Sommer (1951–1993), American author
- Sebastian Sommer (born 1994), German politician
- Thelma Thall Sommer, née Thelma Thall (born 1924), American table tennis player
- Theo Sommer (1930–2022), German journalist
- Tim Sommer, American musician and record producer
- Vladimír Sommer (1921–1997), Czech composer
- William Sommer (1867–1949), American painter
- Yann Sommer (born 1988), Swiss footballer

== In fiction ==
- Dr Jochen Sommer, the fictional editor answering readers' questions (agony uncle) of the German youth magazine Bravo
- The Story of Mr Sommer, a German novel
- Sommer (TV series), a Danish TV-drama aired on DR1 in 2008
- Bobbi "Blade" Sommer, a character from Batman Beyond

== See also ==
- Sommer Gentry, American mathematician
- Sommers (surname)
- Somers (surname)
- Zomer
- Eli Somer (born 1951), professor of clinical psychology
