= Gene therapy for epilepsy =

Medical treatment research

Gene therapy is being studied for some forms of epilepsy. It relies on viral or non-viral vectors to deliver DNA or RNA to target brain areas where seizures arise, in order to prevent the development of epilepsy or to reduce the frequency and/or severity of seizures. Gene therapy has delivered promising results in early stage clinical trials for other neurological disorders such as Parkinson's disease, raising the hope that it will become a treatment for intractable epilepsy.

== Overview ==
Epilepsy refers to a group of chronic neurological disorders that are characterized by seizures, affecting over 50 million people, or 0.4–1% of the global population. There is a basic understanding of the pathophysiology of epilepsy, especially of forms characterized by the onset of seizures from a specific area of the brain (partial-onset epilepsy). Although most patients respond to medication, approximately 20%–30% do not improve with or fail to tolerate antiepileptic drugs. For such patients, surgery to remove the epileptogenic zone can be offered in a small minority, but is not feasible if the seizures arise from brain areas that are essential for language, vision, movement or other functions. As a result, many people with epilepsy are left without any treatment options to consider, and thus there is a strong need for the development of innovative methods for treating epilepsy.

Through the use of viral vector gene transfer, with the purpose of delivering DNA or RNA to the epileptogenic zone, several neuropeptides, ion channels and neurotransmitter receptors have shown potential as transgenes for epilepsy treatment. Among vectors are adenovirus and adeno-associated virus vectors (AAV), which have the properties of high and efficient transduction, ease of production in high volumes, a wide range of hosts, and extended gene expression. Lentiviral vectors have also shown promise.

== Clinical research ==
Among challenges to clinical translation of gene therapy are possible immune responses to the viral vectors and transgenes and the possibility of insertional mutagenesis, which can be detrimental to patient safety. Scaling up from the volume needed for animal trials to that needed for effective human transfection is an area of difficulty, although it has been overcome in other diseases. With its size of less than 20 nm, AAV in part addresses these problems, allowing for its passage through the extracellular space, leading to widespread transfection. Although lentivectors can integrate in the genome of the host this may not represent a risk for treatment of neurological diseases because adult neurons do not divide and so are less prone to insertional mutagenesis

== Viral approaches in preclinical development ==
In finding a method for treating epilepsy, the pathophysiology of epilepsy is considered. As the seizures that characterize epilepsy typically result from excessive and synchronous discharges of excitatory neurons, the logical goal for gene therapy treatment is to reduce excitation or enhance inhibition. Out of the viral approaches, neuropeptide transgenes being researched are somatostatin, galanin, and neuropeptide Y (NPY). However, adenosine and gamma-aminobutyric acid (GABA) and GABA receptors are gaining more momentum as well. Other transgenes being studied are potassium channels and tools for on-demand suppression of excitability (optogenetics and chemogenetics).

=== Adenosine ===
Adenosine is an inhibitory nucleoside that doubles up as a neuromodulator, aiding in the modulation of brain function. It has anti-inflammatory properties, in addition to neuroprotective and anti-epileptic properties. The most prevalent theory is that upon brain injury there is an increased expression of the adenosine kinase (ADK). The increase in adenosine kinase results in an increased metabolic rate for adenosine nucleosides. Due to the decrease in these nucleosides that possess anti-epileptic properties and the overexpression of the ADK, seizures are triggered, potentially resulting in the development of epileptogenesis. Studies have shown that ADK overexpression results from astrogliosis following a brain injury, which can lead to the development of epileptogenesis. While ADK overexpression leads to increased susceptibility to seizures, the effects can be counteracted and moderated by adenosine. Based on the properties afforded by adenosine in preventing seizures, in addition to its FDA approval in the treatment of other ailments such as tachycardia and chronic pain, adenosine is an ideal target for the development of anti-epileptic gene therapies.

=== Galanin ===
Galanin, found primarily within the central nervous system (limbic system, piriform cortex, and amygdala), plays a role in the reduction of long term potentiation (LTP), regulating consumption habits, as well as inhibiting seizure activity. Introduced back in the 1990s by Mazarati et al., galanin has been shown to have neuroprotective and inhibitory properties. Through the use of mice that are deficient in GalR1 receptors, a picrotoxin-kindled model was utilized to show that galanin plays a role in modulating and preventing hilar cell loss as well as decreasing the duration of induced seizures. Conducted studies confirm these findings of preventing hilar hair cell loss, decreasing the number and duration of induced seizures, increasing the stimulation threshold required to induce seizures, and suppressing the release of glutamate that would increase susceptibility to seizure activity. Galanin expression can be utilized to significantly moderate and reduce seizure activity and limit seizure cell death.

=== Neuropeptide Y ===
Neuropeptide Y (NPY), which is found in the autonomic nervous system, helps modulate the hypothalamus, and therefore, consumption habits. Experiments have been conducted to determine the effect of NPY on animal models before and after induced seizures. To evaluate the effect prior to seizures, one study inserted vectors 8 weeks prior to kindling, showing an increase in seizure threshold. In order to evaluate the effects after epileptogenesis was present, the vectors were injected into the hippocampus of rats after seizures were induced. This resulted in a reduction of seizure activity. These studies established that NPY increased the seizure threshold in rats, arrested disease progression, and reduced seizure duration. After examining the effects of NPY on behavioral and physiological responses, it was discovered that it had no effect on LTP, learning, or memory. A protocol for NPY gene transfer is being reviewed by the FDA.

=== Somatostatin ===
Somatostatin is a neuropeptide and neuromodulator that plays a role in the regulation of hormones as well as aids in sleep and motor activity. It is primarily found in interneurons that modulates the firing rates of pyramidal cells primarily at a local level. They feed-forward inhibit pyramidal cells. In a series of studies where somatostatin was expressed in a rodent kindling model, it was concluded that somatostatin resulted in a decreased average duration for seizures, increasing its potential as an anti-seizure drug. The theory in utilizing somatostatin is that if pyramidal cells are eliminated, then the feed forward, otherwise known as inhibition, is lost. Somatostatin containing interneurons carry the neurotransmitter GABA, which primarily hyperpolarizes the cells, which is where the feed forward theory is derived from. The hope of gene therapy is that by overexpressing somatostatin in specific cells, and increasing the GABAergic tone, it is possible to restore balance between inhibition and excitation.

=== Potassium channels ===
Kv1.1 is a voltage-gated potassium channel encoded by the KCNA1 gene. It is widely expressed in the brain and peripheral nerves, and plays a role in controlling the excitability of neurons and the amount of neurotransmitter released from axon terminals. Successful gene therapy using lentiviral delivery of KCNA1 has been reported in a rodent model of focal motor cortex epilepsy. The treatment was well tolerated, with no detectable effect on sensorimotor coordination. Gene therapy with a modified potassium channel delivered using either a non-integrating lentivector that avoids the risk of insertional mutagenesis or an AAV has also been shown to be effective in other models of epilepsy.

=== Optogenetics ===
A potential obstacle to clinical translation of gene therapy is that viral vector-mediated manipulation of the genetic make-up of neurons is irreversible. An alternative approach is to use tools for on-demand suppression of neuronal and circuit excitability. The first such approach was to use optogenetics. Several laboratories have shown that the inhibitory light-sensitive protein Halorhodopsin can suppress seizure-like discharges in vitro as well as epileptic activity in vivo. A draw-back of optogenetics is that light needs to be delivered to the area of the brain expressing the opsin. This can be achieved with laser-coupled fiber-optics or light-emitting diodes, but these are invasive.

=== Chemogenetics ===
An alternative approach for on-demand control of circuit excitability that does not require light delivery to the brain is to use chemogenetics. This relies on expressing a mutated receptor in the seizure focus, which does not respond to endogenous neurotransmitters but can be activated by an exogenous drug. G-protein coupled receptors mutated in this way are called Designer Receptors Exclusively Activated by Designer Drugs (DREADDs). Success in treating epilepsy has been reported using the inhibitory DREADD hM4D(Gi), which is derived from the M4 muscarinic receptor. AAV-mediated expression of hM4D(Gi) in a rodent model of focal epilepsy on its own had no effect, but when activated by the drug clozapine N-oxide it suppressed seizures. The treatment had no detectable side effects and is, in principle, suited for clinical translation. Olanzapine has been identified as a full and potent activator of hM4D(Gi). A 'closed-loop' variant of chemogenetics to stop seizures, which avoids the need for an exogenous ligand, relies on a glutamate-gated chloride channel which inhibits neurons whenever the extracellular concentration of the excitatory neurotransmitter glutamate rises.

=== CRISPR ===
A mouse model of Dravet syndrome has been treated using a variant of CRISPR that relies on a guide RNA and a dead Cas9 (dCas9) protein to recruit transcriptional activators to the promoter region of the sodium channel gene Scn1a in interneurons.

== Non-viral approaches ==
Magnetofection is done through the use of super paramagnetic iron oxide nanoparticles coated with polyethylenimine. Iron oxide nanoparticles are ideal for biomedical applications in the body due to their biodegradable, cationic, non-toxic, and FDA-approved nature. Under gene transfer conditions, the receptors of interest are coated with the nanoparticles. The receptors will then home in and travel to the target of interest. Once the particle docks, the DNA is delivered to the cell via pinocytosis or endocytosis. Upon delivery, the temperature is increased ever so slightly, lysing the iron oxide nanoparticle and releasing the DNA. Overall, the technique is useful for combatting slow vector accumulation and low vector concentration at target areas. The technique is also customizable to the physical and biochemical properties of the receptors by modifying the characteristics of the iron oxide nanoparticles.

== Future implications ==
The use of gene therapy in treating neurological disorders such as epilepsy has presented itself as an increasingly viable area of ongoing research with the primary targets being somatostatin, galanin, neuropeptide y, potassium channels, optogenetics and chemogenetics for epilepsy. As the field of gene therapy continues to grow and show promising results for the treatment of epilepsy among other diseases, additional research needs to be done in ensuring patient safety, developing alternative methods for DNA delivery, and finding feasible methods for scaling up delivery volumes.
