= Zomer =

Zomer is a Dutch surname meaning "summer". Some families have been traced back to a farm or other address with the name "summer house" or such, but others may have a personal descriptive origin. Vairiant forms are Somer and Zomers. People with the name include:

- Davide Zomer (born 1977), Italian football player
- Hanna Zomer (1925–2003), Czechoslovakia-born Israeli journalist
- Hans Zomer (born 1968), Dutch humanitarian in Ireland
- Herman Zomers (fl. 1938), Dutch East Indies football player
- Jan Pietersz Zomer (1641–1724), Dutch engraver and art collector
- Johannette Zomer (born 1972), Dutch concert and opera soprano
- Ramon Zomer (born 1983), Dutch football player

== See also ==
- Sommers (surname)
- Somers (surname)
- Sommer
