= Reward devaluation =

Decline of perceived value of a reward

Reward devaluation refers to a psychological and neurobiological phenomenon where the subjective value or motivational significance of a reward diminishes over time, often due to repeated exposure, satiation, or changes in contextual relevance.

== Overview ==
This process is critical in behavioral neuroscience, cognitive psychology, and economics, as it influences decision-making, learning, and adaptive behavior. For example, animals or humans may reduce their effort to obtain a reward if its perceived value decreases (e.g., due to overconsumption or negative associations). The concept is often studied in paradigms like operant conditioning, where devaluation of a reinforcer (e.g., food) can weaken previously learned behaviors. Clinically, aberrant reward devaluation mechanisms are implicated in psychiatric conditions such as depression, where patients exhibit anhedonia (diminished pleasure in rewarding activities) and a hypersensitivity to negative outcomes, potentially reflecting dysregulated interactions between the orbitofrontal cortex (OFC), anterior cingulate cortex (ACC), and basolateral amygdala (BLA). These regions are thought to underlie the inability to update reward values in response to changing environmental or internal states, perpetuating motivational deficits. The phenomenon also plays a role in understanding disorders like addiction, where impaired devaluation mechanisms may drive compulsive reward-seeking despite adverse consequences.
