= Robert Sommer Award =

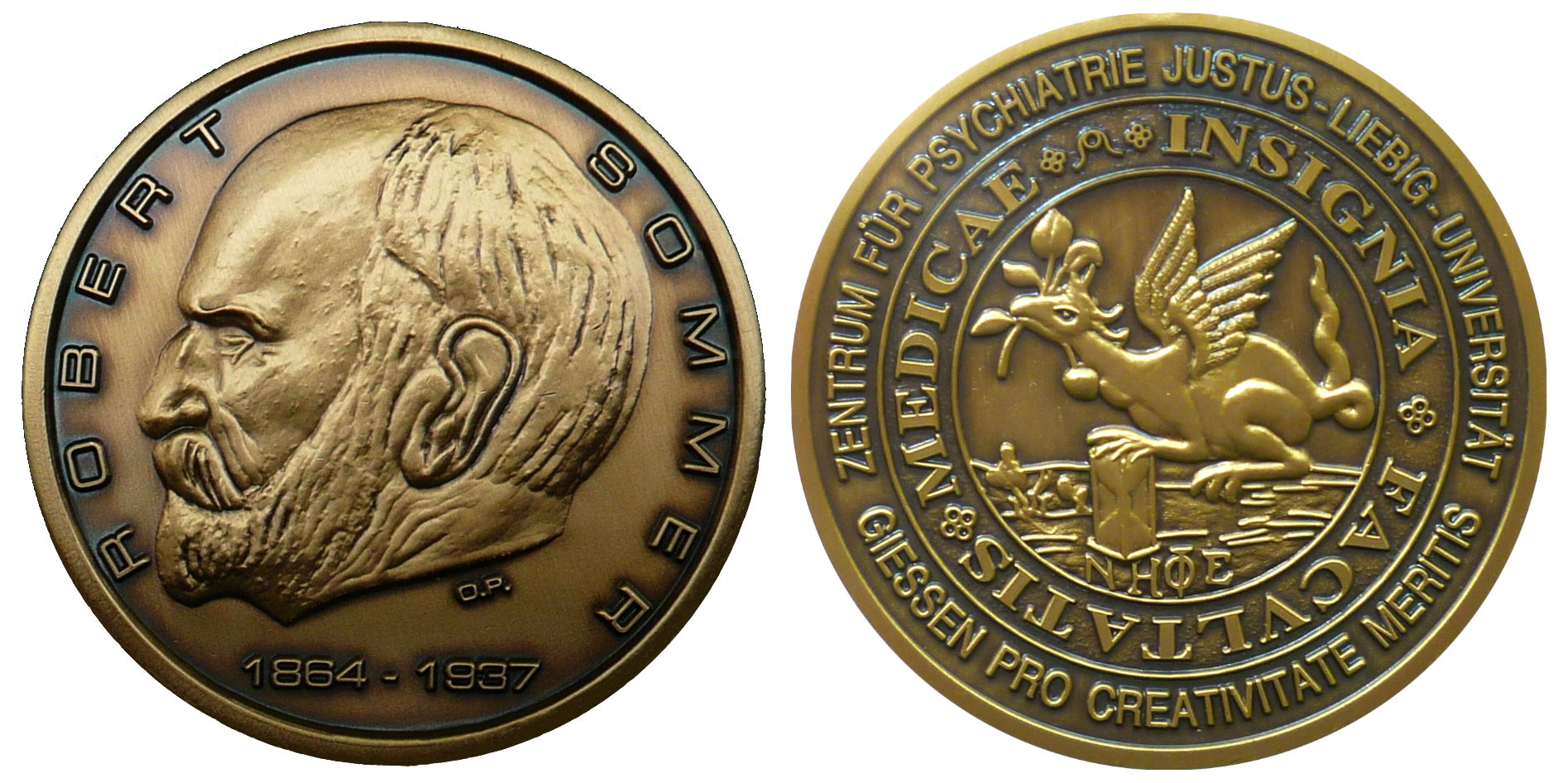
Robert Sommer Award Medal (front/back)

The Robert-Sommer Award is a prize awarded for scientific work done in the field of schizophrenia research. It has been awarded since 1996 by the Robert-Sommer Research Society. It commemorates Robert Sommer, a German psychiatrist born in Grottkau and first director of the Psychiatric University Hospital in Giessen. He is remembered for his work in experimental psychology.Traditionally the award is given to the recipient during the GISS conference in Giessen.

== Recipients ==
- 2025 Iris Sommer (Groningen, Netherlands)
- 2023 Andreas Meyer-Lindenberg (Mannheim, Germany)
- 2016 Barbara Sahakian & Trevor Robbins (Cambridge, Great Britain)
- 2013 Christos Pantelis (Melbourne, Australia)
- 2010 David A. Lewis (Pittsburgh, United States)
- 2008 Shitij Kapur (London, Great Britain)
- 2006 Lynn DeLisi (New York, United States)
- 2004 Uta Frith and Chris Frith (London, Great Britain)
- 2002 Daniel Weinberger (Bethesda, United States)
- 2000 Robin Murray (London, Great Britain)
- 1998 Nancy Andreasen (Iowa, United States)
- 1996 Timothy Crow (Oxford, Great Britain)
