= Psychopathology =

Scientific study of mental disorders

Psychopathology is the study of mental illness. It includes the signs and symptoms of all mental disorders. The field includes abnormal cognition, maladaptive behavior, and experiences which differ according to social norms. This discipline is an in-depth study of symptoms, behaviors, causes, course, development, categorization, treatments, strategies, and more.

Biological psychopathology is the study of the biological etiology of abnormal cognitions, behaviour and experiences. Child psychopathology is a specialization applied to children and adolescents.

== History ==
Early explanations for mental illnesses were influenced by religious belief and superstition. Psychological conditions that are now classified as mental disorders were initially attributed to possessions by evil spirits, demons, and the devil. This idea was widely accepted up until the sixteenth and seventeenth centuries.

The Greek physician Hippocrates was one of the first to reject the idea that mental disorders were the result of possession by demons or the devil, and instead looked to natural causes. He firmly believed the symptoms of mental disorders were due to diseases originating in the brain. Hippocrates suspected that these states of insanity were due to imbalances of fluids in the body. He identified four fluids in particular: blood, black bile, yellow bile, and phlegm.

Furthermore, not long after Hippocrates, the philosopher Plato argued that the mind, body, and spirit worked as a unit. Any imbalance brought to these compositions of the individual could bring distress or lack of harmony within the individual. This philosophical idea would remain in perspective until the seventeenth century. It was later challenged by Laing (1960) along with Laing and Esterson (1964) who noted that it was the family environment that led to the formation of adaptive strategies.

In the eighteenth century's Romantic Movement, the idea that healthy parent-child relationships provided sanity became a prominent idea. Philosopher Jean-Jacques Rousseau introduced the notion that trauma in childhood could have negative implications later in adulthood.

In the 1600s and 1700s insane asylums started to be opened to house those with mental disorders. Asylums were places where restraint techniques and treatments could be tested on patients who were confined. These were early precursors for psychiatric hospitals.

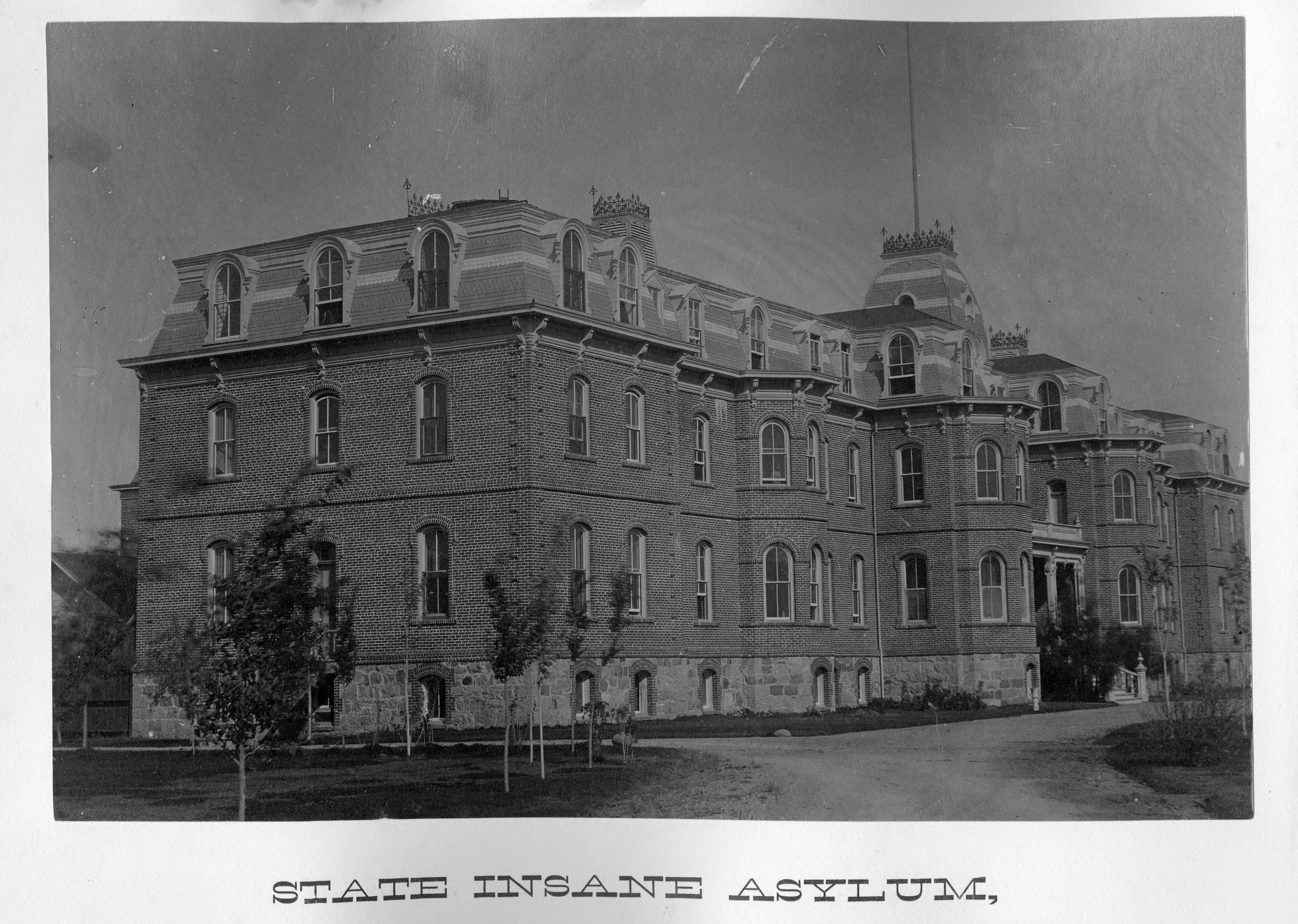
A state insane asylum in Nevada.

In 1875 the German book Textbook of Forensic Psychopathology was published, written by Richard von Krafft-Ebing, which became a standard psychiatric textbook for Universities across Germany.

The scientific discipline of psychopathology was founded by Karl Jaspers in 1913. It was referred to as "static understanding" and its purpose was to graphically recreate the "mental phenomenon" experienced by the client. A few years earlier, in 1899, the German book Lehrbuch der Psychopathologischen Untersuchungs-Methoden was published by Robert Sommer.

=== Psychoanalysis ===
Sigmund Freud proposed a method for treating psychopathology through dialogue between a patient and a psychoanalyst. Talking therapy would originate from his ideas on the individual's experiences and the natural human efforts to make sense of the world and life.

=== Evolutionary Perspectives ===
Evolutionary psychiatry argues that some psychiatric conditions might have persisted because they carried evolutionarily adaptive functions historically, or because of an evolutionary mismatch with modern environments.

== As the study of psychiatric disorders ==
The study of psychopathology is interdisciplinary, with contributions coming from clinical psychology, abnormal psychology, social psychology, and developmental psychology, as well as neuropsychology and other psychology subdisciplines. Other related fields include psychiatry, neuroscience, criminology, social work, sociology, epidemiology, and statistics.

Psychopathology can be broadly separated into descriptive and explanatory. Descriptive psychopathology involves categorising, defining and understanding symptoms as reported by people and observed through their behaviour, which are then assessed according to a social norm. Explanatory psychopathology looks to find explanations for certain kinds of symptoms according to theoretical models such as psychodynamics, cognitive behavioural therapy or through understanding how they have been constructed by drawing upon Constructivist Grounded Theory (Charmaz, 2016) or Interpretative Phenomenological Analysis (Smith, Flowers & Larkin, 2013).

There are several ways to characterise the presence of psychopathology in an individual as a whole. One strategy is to assess a person along four dimensions: deviance, distress, dysfunction, and danger, known collectively as the four Ds. Another conceptualisation, the p factor, sees psychopathology as a general, overarching construct that influences psychiatric symptoms.

== Mental disorders ==
Mental disorders are defined by a set of characteristic features, more than just one symptom. In order to be classified for diagnosis, the symptoms cannot represent an expected response to a common stress or loss that is related to an event. Syndromes are a set of simultaneous symptoms that represent a disorder. Common mental health disorders include depression, generalized anxiety disorder (GAD), panic disorder, phobias, social anxiety disorder, obsessive-compulsive disorder (OCD), and post-traumatic stress disorder (PTSD). “A mental disorder is a syndrome characterized by clinically significant disturbance in an individual’s cognition, emotion regulation, or behavior that reflects a dysfunction in the psychological, biological, or developmental processes underlying mental functioning.”

Depression is one of the most common and most debilitating mental disorders worldwide. It affects how individuals think, feel, and act. Symptoms vary depending on each individual person and include feeling sad, irritable, hopeless, or losing interest in activities once enjoyed.

Generalized anxiety disorder is feeling worried or nervous more frequently than what correlates to real-life stressors. It is more common in women than men and includes symptoms such as having trouble controlling worries, feelings of nervousness or restlessness, and difficulty relaxing.

Across large populations, women show higher diagnosed prevalence of internalizing mental disorders, while men show higher prevalence of externalizing disorders and higher rates of suicide mortality. These differences reflect biological factors, differential exposure to stressors, and gendered patterns of diagnosis and help-seeking.

== The four Ds ==
A description of the four Ds when defining abnormality:

1. Deviance is variation from statistical norms that result in a conflict with society. This term describes the idea that specific thoughts, behaviors and emotions are considered deviant when they are unacceptable or not common in society. Clinicians must, however, remember that minority groups are not always deemed deviant just because they may not have anything in common with other groups. Therefore, an individual's actions are defined as deviant when their behaviour is deemed unacceptable by the culture they belong to. However, many disorders have a relation between patterns of deviance and therefore need to be evaluated in a differential diagnostic model.
2. Distress has to do with the discomfort that is experienced by the person with the disorder. This term accounts for negative feelings by the individual with the disorder. They may feel deeply troubled and affected by their illness. Behaviors and feelings that cause distress to individuals or to others around them are considered abnormal if the condition is upsetting to the person experiencing it. Distress is related to dysfunction in that it can be a useful asset in accurately perceiving dysfunction in an individual's life. However, these two are not always related because an individual can be highly dysfunctional while at the same time experiencing minimal stress. The important characteristics of distress are the upsetting events themselves and the way one responds to them.
3. Dysfunction involves maladaptive behavior that impairs the individual's ability to perform normal daily functions. It includes dysfunction in the psychological, biological, or developmental processes that are associated with mental functioning. This maladaptive behavior has to be significant enough to be considered a diagnosis. It is recommended to look for dysfunction across an individual's life experience because there is a chance the dysfunction may appear in clear observable view and in places where it is less likely to appear. Such maladaptive behaviours prevent the individual from living a normal, healthy lifestyle. However, dysfunctional behaviour is not always caused by a disorder; it may be voluntary, such as engaging in a hunger strike.
4. Duration is useful for clinicians as a criterion for diagnosis. Most symptoms have a specific duration that they must meet before being diagnosed. However, this can be harmful as not every person's experience is the same.

=== The p factor ===
Benjamin Lahey and colleagues first proposed a general "psychopathology factor" in 2012, or simply "p factor". This construct shares its conceptual similarity with the g factor of general intelligence. Instead of conceptualising psychopathology as consisting of several discrete categories of mental disorders, the p factor is dimensional and influences whether psychiatric symptoms in general are present or absent. The symptoms that are present then combine to form several distinct diagnoses. The p factor is modelled in the Hierarchical Taxonomy of Psychopathology. Although researchers initially conceived a three-factor explanation for psychopathology generally, a subsequent study provided more evidence for a single factor that is sequentially comorbid, recurrent/chronic, and exists on a continuum of severity and chronicity.

Higher scores on the p factor dimension have been found to be correlated with higher levels of functional impairment, greater incidence of problems in developmental history, and more diminished early-life brain function. In addition, those with higher levels of the p factor are more likely to have inherited a genetic predisposition to mental illness. The existence of the p factor may explain why it has been "... challenging to find causes, consequences, biomarkers, and treatments with specificity to individual mental disorders."

A 2020 review of the p factor found that many studies support its validity and that it is generally stable throughout one's life. A high p factor is associated with many adverse effects, including poor academic performance, impulsivity, criminality, suicidality, reduced foetal growth, lower executive functioning, and a greater number of psychiatric diagnoses. A partial genetic basis for the p factor has also been supported.

Alternatively, the p factor has also been interpreted as an index of general impairment rather than being a specific index that causes psychopathology.

== As mental symptoms ==
The term psychopathology may also be used to denote behaviours or experiences which are indicative of mental illness, even if they do not constitute a formal diagnosis. For example, the presence of hallucinations may be considered as a psychopathological sign, even if there are not enough symptoms present to fulfil the criteria for one of the disorders listed in the DSM or ICD.

In a more general sense, any behaviour or experience which causes impairment, distress or disability, particularly if it is thought to arise from a functional breakdown in either the cognitive or neurocognitive systems in the brain, may be classified as psychopathology. It remains unclear how strong the distinction between maladaptive traits and mental disorders actually is, e.g. neuroticism is often described as the personal level of minor psychiatric symptoms.

== Diagnostic and Statistical Manual of Mental Disorders ==
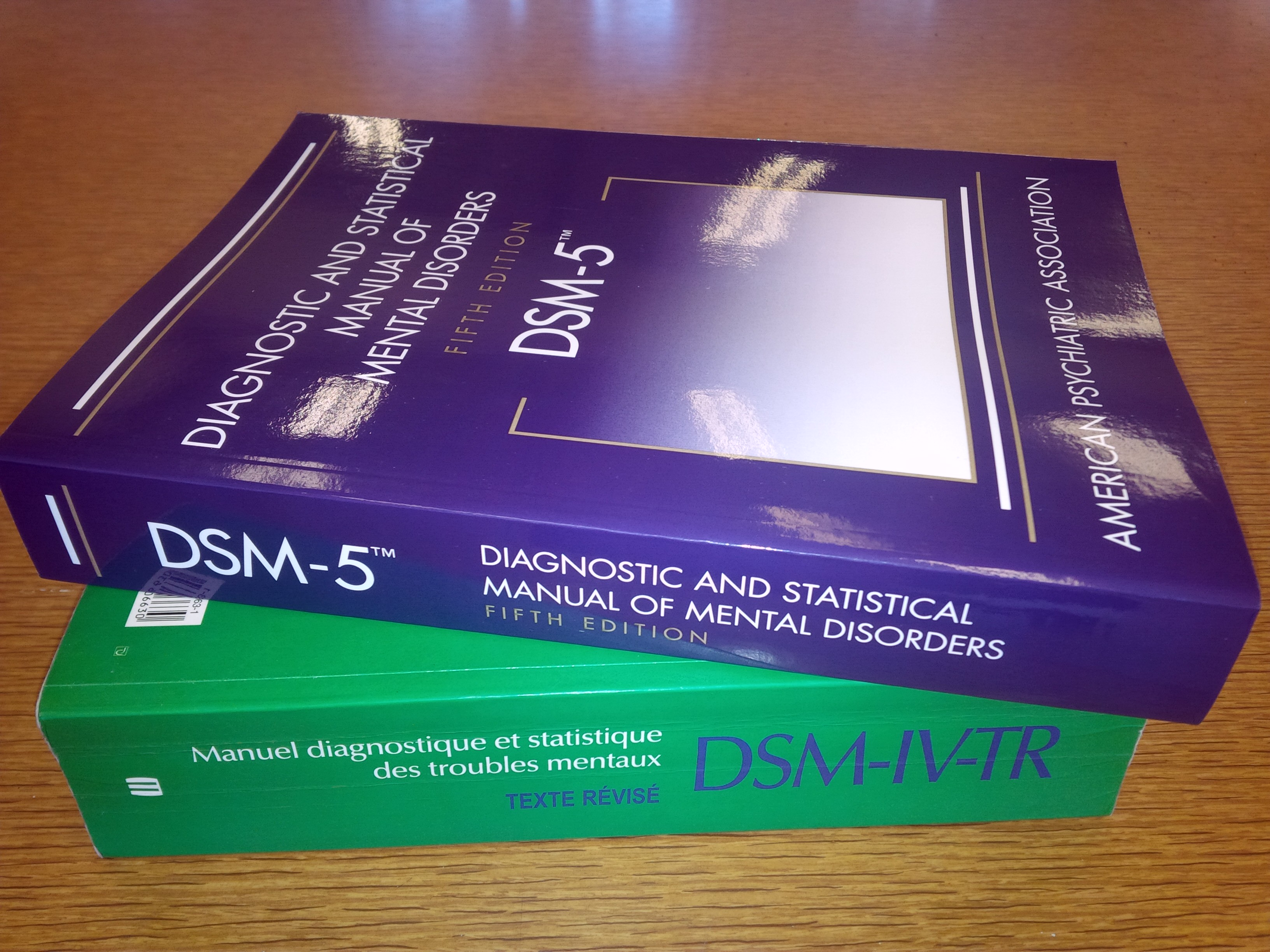
The DSM IV and 5

The Diagnostic and Statistical Manual of Mental Disorders (DSM) is a guideline for the diagnosis and understanding of mental disorders. The American Psychiatric Association (APA) sponsors the editing, writing, reviewing and publishing of this book. It is a reference book on mental health and brain-related conditions and disorders. It serves as reference for a range of professionals in medicine and mental health in the United States particularly. These professionals include psychologists, counsellors, physicians, social workers, psychiatric nurses and nurse practitioners, marriage and family therapists, and more. The current DSM is the fifth, most recent edition of this book. It was released in May 2013. Each edition makes significant changes to the classification of disorders.

== Research Domain Criteria ==
The RDoC framework is a set of research principles for investigating mental disorders. It is meant to create a new approach to mental illness that leads to better diagnosis, prevention, intervention, and cures. It is not necessarily meant to serve as a diagnostic guide or replace the DSM, however, it is meant to examine various degrees of dysfunction. It was developed by the US National Institute of Mental Health (NIMH). It aims to address heterogeneity by providing a more symptom based framework for understanding mental disorders. It relied on dimensions that span the range from normal to abnormal and allows investigators to work with a larger database. It uses six major functional domains to examine neurobehavioral functioning. Different aspects of each domain are represented by constructs which are studied along the full range of functioning. Together all of the domains form a matrix that could represent research ideas. It is a heuristic, and acknowledges that research topics will change and grow as science emerges.

== See also ==
- Adverse Childhood Experiences movement
- Biological psychiatry
- Cerebral atrophy
- Evidence-based medicine
- Evolutionary psychiatry
- Glossary of psychiatry
- Neurodegeneration
- Neuroimmunology
- Neuroinflammation
- Stress in early childhood
- Traumatic brain injury
