= Somers (surname) =

Somers is a surname. Notable people with the surname include:

- Adeline Marie Somers (1852–1920), British humanitarian and advocate for penal reform
- Alan Somers (born 1941), American swimmer
- Alex Somers (born 1984), American visual artist and musician
- Andrew Lawrence Somers (1895–1949), American politician from New York
- Armonía Somers (1914–1994), Uruguayan feminist, pedagogue, novelist and short story writer
- Art Somers (1902–1992), Canadian ice hockey player
- Arthur Somers-Cocks, 6th Baron Somers (1887–1944), British Army officer, Governor of Victoria
- Bart Somers (born 1964), Belgian politician
- Brett Somers (1924–2007), Canadian-born American actress, singer, and comedian
- Charles Somers (1868–1934), American executive and investor in baseball
- Daryl Somers (born 1951), Australian television personality
- Edmund Sigismund Somers (1759?–1824), Irish physician
- George Somers, (1554–1610), British admiral who founded the colony of Bermuda
- Hans Somers (born 1978), Belgian football midfielder
- Harry Somers (1925–1999), Canadian composer and pianist
- Jeff Somers (born 1971), American science fiction author
- John Somers, 1st Baron Somers (1651–1716), Lord Chancellor of England
- Joseph Somers-Morales (born 1987), American singer known as SoMo
- John Somers-Smith (1887–1916), British rower
- Joseph Somers (cyclist) (1917–1966), Belgian racing cyclist
- Joseph Somers (artist) (born 1950s/60s), American artist
- Julian Somers (1903–1976), English stage and screen actor
- Kelly Somers (born 1990), English sports presenter and reporter
- Linda Somers (born 1961), American long-distance runner
- Luke Somers (1981–2014), British-American photojournalist who was kidnapped in 2013
- Marc Somers (born 1961), Belgian racing cyclist
- Marlies Somers (born 1973), Dutch voice actress
- Peter Somers (1878–1914), Scottish footballer
- Peter J. Somers (1850–1924), American politician from Wisconsin
- Richard Somers (1778–1804), American Navy officer
- Steve Somers (born 1947), American radio host from New York
- Suzanne Somers (1946–2023), American actress
- Thomas Somers (athlete) (born 1997), British sprinter
- Vaughan Somers (born 1951), Australian golfer
- Walter Somers (1839–1917), English industrialist
- Wieki Somers (born 1976), Dutch designer

== See also ==
- Jane Somers, pseudonym used for two novels by British writer Doris Lessing (1919–2013)
- Sommers (surname)
- Zomer, Dutch surname
