= Robert Sommer (psychiatrist) =

German psychiatrist and genealogist (1864–1937)

Karl Robert Sommer
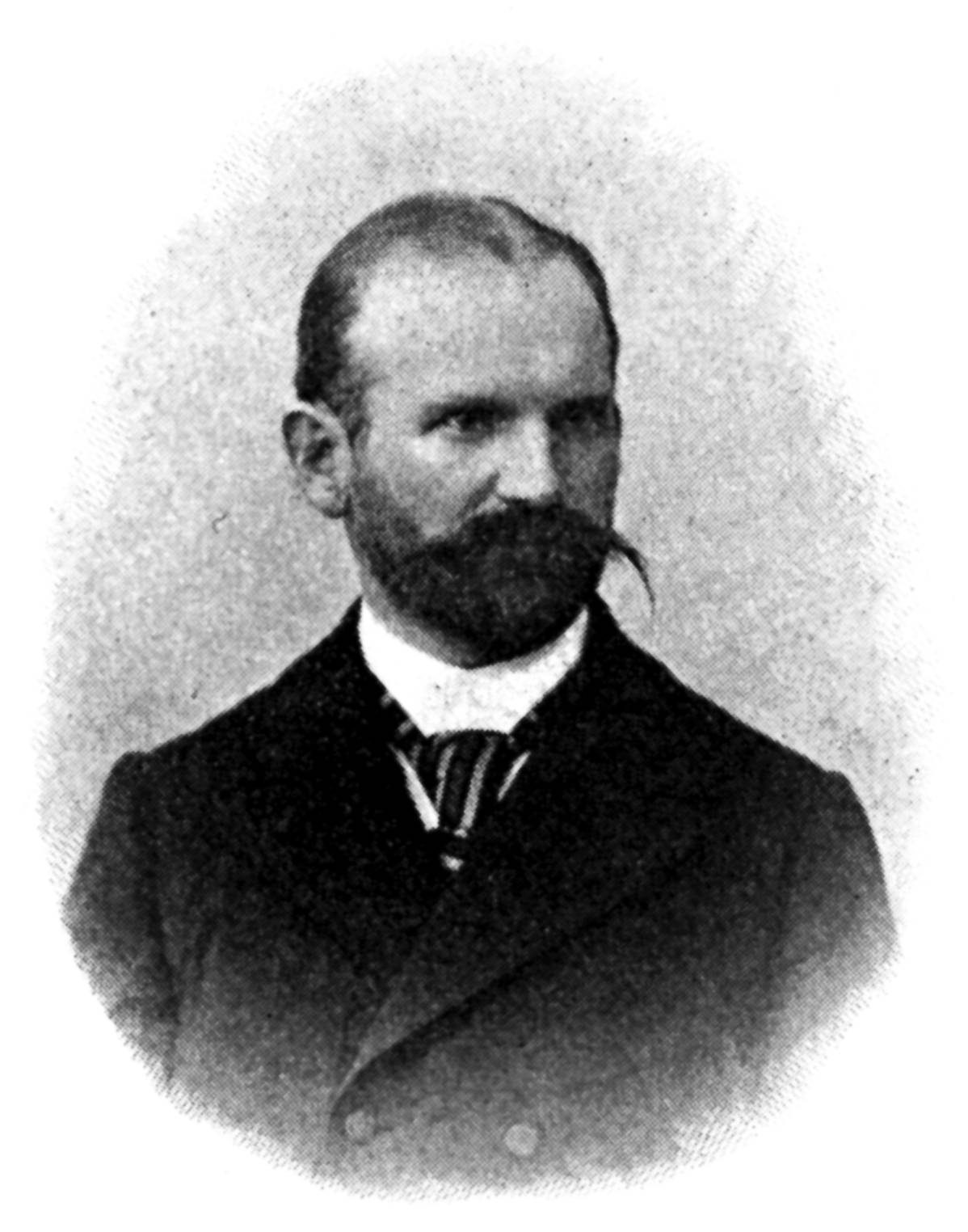
- Robert Sommer (1 January 1901)
- Born: 19 December 1864; Grottkau, Kingdom of Prussia
- Died: 2 February 1937 (aged 72); Giessen, Hesse, Germany
- Known for: Research on experimental psychology. Co-founder of the „Gesellschaft für experimentelle Psychologie“. Founder of „Deutscher Ausschuss für psychische Hygiene“ in 1923 and „Deutscher Verband für psychische Hygiene“ in 1925 which he also directed until 1933.
- Spouse: Emmy Schaefer (1867–1935)
- Awards: Second prize by the Berlin Academy of Sciences, 1886 Elected a member of the Leopoldina, 1936
- Scientific career
- Fields: Psychiatry
- Institutions: Humboldt University of Berlin, University of Würzburg, Psychiatric hospital in Rybnik, University of Giessen

Karl Robert Sommer (19 December 1864, in Grottkau – 2 February 1937, in Giessen) was a german psychiatrist and genealogist born in Grottkau. He is remembered for his work in experimental psychology. He coined the term „Psychohygiene“ in 1901 and founded the „German Association for Psychohygiene“ and the „Society for Experimental Psychology“ (since 1929 „German Society for Psychology“). He is remembered for his work in experimental psychology. He also published on genealogy, philosophy, and forensics. He was also an active inventor and involved in local politics.

== Early life and career ==
Sommer was the youngest of six children of the lawyer Karl Friedrich Adolf Sommer (1824-1903) and his wife Anna, née Lange (1831-1872). Actually, Robert Sommer wanted to become a naval officer, but his nearsightedness did not allow it.

He studied medicine and philosophy in Freiburg im Breisgau and Leipzig, relocating in 1885 to Berlin, where he composed a work on the philosophy of John Locke in relation to René Descartes. In 1887, he received his doctorate of philosophy, afterwards working as an assistant in the laboratory of Wilhelm Wundt (1832-1920) at Leipzig. From 1889, he was an assistant at a psychiatric hospital in Rybnik, earning his habilitation at Würzburg in 1892.

In 1895, he became an associate professor of psychiatry at the University of Giessen, where, during the following year, he established a "centre for psychiatry". In 1904, he was a co-founder of the Gesellschaft für experimentelle Psychologie (Society for experimental Psychology).

In 1904, Sommer, together with his colleagues Georg Elias Müller, Hermann Ebbinghaus, Oswald Külpe, Ernst Meumann and Friedrich Schumann, convened the first "Congress for Experimental Psychology" in Giessen, at which the Society for Experimental Psychology was founded.

Sommer died in 1937 of pneumonia contracted during a six-hour winter hike.

On the occasion of the 100th anniversary of the Giessen Psychiatric Clinic, the Robert Sommer Award Symposium was established, at which international scientists have since presented and discussed research results on schizophrenia, and the Robert Sommer Medal has also been awarded for special services in schizophrenia research.

In addition, a street in Giessen is named after Robert Sommer.

== Written works ==
- Lockes Verhältnis zu Descartes (Locke's relationship to Descartes), (1888)
- Grundzüge einer Geschichte der deutschen Psychologie und Aesthetik von Wolf - Baumgarten bis Kant - Schiller (History of German psychology and aesthetics of Wolff-Baumgarten to Kant-Schiller), (1890)
- Diagnostik der Geisteskrankheiten (Diagnostics on mental illness), (1894)
- Lehrbuch der psychopathologischen Untersuchungsmethoden (Textbook on research methods of psychopathology), 1899)
- Kriminalpsychologie und strafrechtliche Psychopathologie, (1904)
- Familienforschung und Vererbungslehre (Family studies and genetics), (1907)
- Goethes Wetzlarer Verwandtschaft, (1908)
- Goethe im Lichte der Vererbungslehre (1908)
- Öffentliche Ruhehallen, (1913)
- Krieg und Seelenleben (War and spiritual life), (1916)
- Die körperliche Erziehung der deutschen Studentenschaft, (1916)
- Über Familienähnlichkeit (On family resemblance), (1917)
- Die Schweizer Soldan-Familien, (1921)
- Familienforschung und Vererbungslehre, (1922)
- Tierpsychologie (Animal psychology), (1925)
- Die Nibelungenwege von Worms über Wien zur Etzelburg (A German hiking book), (1929)
