= Sommers (surname) =

Sommers is a surname. Notable people with the surname include:

- Ben Sommers (1906–1985), American philanthropist
- Charles Sommers (1862–1922), Australian politician
- Christina Hoff Sommers (born 1950), American feminist academic
- Dale Sommers, American radio personality and country music DJ
- David W. Sommers (born 1943), Sergeant Major of the U.S. Marine Corps 1987–91
- Drew Sommers (born 2000), American baseball player
- Fred Sommers (1923–2014), American philosopher
- Helen Sommers (1932–2017), American politician
- Jack Sommers (1917–1975), American professional football player
- Jay Sommers (1917–1985), American television writer and producer
- Joanie Sommers (born 1941), American singer and actress
- Robert Sommers (1911–2000), Canadian politician
- Rudy Sommers (1886–1949), American professional baseball player
- Samuel Sommers, American social psychologist
- Stephen Sommers (born 1962), American film director and writer
- Tamler Sommers, 21st century American philosopher
- William Sommers (died 1560), court jester of Henry VIII of England

Fictional characters:

- Jaime Sommers, the "Bionic Woman" of the American TV series

== See also ==
- Somers (surname)
- Summers (surname)
- Sommer, surname
