= Biological psychopathology =

Biological psychopathology is the study of the biological etiology of mental illnesses with a particular emphasis on the genetic and neurophysiological basis of clinical psychology. Biological psychopathology attempts to explain psychiatric disorders using multiple levels of analysis from the genome to brain functioning to behavior. Although closely related to clinical psychology, it is fundamentally an interdisciplinary approach that attempts to synthesize methods across fields such as neuroscience, psychopharmacology, biochemistry, genetics, and physiology. It is known by several alternative names, including "clinical neuroscience" and "experimental psychopathology." Due to the focus on biological processes of the central and peripheral nervous systems, biological psychopathology has been important in developing new biologically-based treatments for mental disorders.

== Scope ==
Biological psychopathology is a field that focuses mostly on the research and understanding the biological basis of major mental disorders such as bipolar and unipolar affective disorder, schizophrenia and Alzheimer's disease. Much of the understanding thus far has come from neuroimaging techniques such as radiotracer positron emission tomography(PET), and functional magnetic resonance imaging (fMRI) scans, as well as genetic studies. Together, neuroimaging with multimodal PET/fMRI, and pharmacological investigations are revealing how the differences in behaviorally relevant brain activations can arise from underlying variations in certain brain signaling pathways. Understanding the detailed interplay between neurotransmitters and the psychiatric drugs that affect them is key to the research within this field. Significant research includes investigations relevant to biological bases such as biochemical, genetic, physiological, neurological, and anatomical fields. In a clinical viewpoint, the etiology of these diseases takes into account various therapies, diet, drugs, potential environmental contaminants, exercise, and adverse effects of life stressors, all of which can cause noticeable biochemical changes.

== Origins and basis ==
Sigmund Freud initially concentrated on the biological causes of mental illness and its relationship to evident behavioral factors. His belief in biological factors lead to the concept that certain drugs, such as cocaine, had an antidepressant functionality. In the 1950s the first modern antipsychotic and antidepressant drugs were developed: chlorpromazine (Thorazine), which was one of the first widely used antipsychotic medications to be developed, and iproniazid, which was one of the first antidepressants developed. The research on some of these drugs helped to formulate the monoamine and catecholamine theories, which alluded to the fact that chemical imbalances provide the basis for mental health disorders. New research points to the concept of neuronal plasticity, specifically mentioning that mental health disorders may involve a neurophysiological problem that inhibits neuronal plasticity.

== Diagnostics ==
This field expresses the importance of accurately identifying and diagnosing mental health disorders. If not accurately diagnosed, certain treatments could only worsen the previous condition. This can be difficult since there are numerous etiologies that could reveal symptoms of mental health disorders. Some important disorders to focus on are: seasonal affective disorder, clinical depression, bipolar disorder, schizophrenia, generalized anxiety disorder, and obsessive compulsive disorder.
