= Edmund Sigismund Somers =

Irish physician

- Born: 1759? Dublin
- Died: 1824
- Occupation: Physician

Edmund Sigismund Somers MRIA (1759? – 1824) was an Irish physician.

== Biography ==
Somers was born in Dublin about 1759, was the son of William Somers, a mechanic. He entered Trinity College, Dublin, on 7 June 1779, and afterwards studied medicine at Edinburgh University, where he graduated M.D. on 12 Sept. 1783. After visiting the medical schools of Paris and Leyden he returned to Dublin, and was elected a member of the Royal Irish Academy. He was admitted a licentiate of the College of Physicians on 22 December 1791, and began to practise in London. On 18 March 1795 he was appointed physician to the forces. In this capacity he proceeded to the Cape of Good Hope as director of hospitals. After several years he retired to England, served in the home district, and then went as staff physician to Jamaica. After two years he returned to England in ill health, and on recovery joined the army in the Peninsula, where the Marquis of Wellington in 1812 appointed him physician in chief to the allied forces. On 18 January 1816 he was nominated a deputy medical inspector, and retired on half pay. He died in London in 1824.

Somers was the author of:

- ‘Dissertatio Physico-medica Inauguralis de Sonis et Auditu,’ Edinburgh, 1783, 8vo.
- ‘Medical Suggestions for the Treatment of Dysentery and Fever among Troops in the Field,’ London, 1816, 8vo (published in both Latin and English).
