= Chemogenetics =

Biochemical technique

Chemogenetics is the process by which macromolecules can be engineered to interact with previously unrecognized small molecules. Chemogenetics as a term was originally coined to describe the observed effects of mutations on chalcone isomerase activity on substrate specificities in the flowers of Dianthus caryophyllus. This method is very similar to optogenetics; however, it uses chemically engineered molecules and ligands instead of light and light-sensitive channels known as opsins.

In recent research projects, chemogenetics has been widely used to understand the relationship between brain activity and behavior. Prior to chemogenetics, researchers used methods such as transcranial magnetic stimulation and deep brain stimulation to study the relationship between neuronal activity and behavior.

== Comparison to optogenetics ==
Optogenetics and chemogenetics are the more recent and popular methods used to study this relationship. Both of these methods target specific brain circuits and cell populations to influence cell activity. However, they use different procedures to accomplish this task. Optogenetics uses light-sensitive channels and pumps that are virally introduced into neurons. Cells' activity, having these channels, can then be manipulated by light. Chemogenetics, on the other hand, uses chemically engineered receptors and exogenous molecules specific for those receptors, to affect the activity of those cells. The engineered macromolecules used to design these receptors include nucleic acid hybrids, kinases, variety of metabolic enzymes, and G-protein coupled receptors such as DREADDs.

DREADDs are the most common G protein–coupled receptors used in chemogenetics. These receptors solely get activated by the drug of interest (inert molecule) and influence physiological and neural processes that take place within and outside of the central nervous system.

Chemogenetics has recently been favored over optogenetics, and it avoids some of the challenges of optogenetics. Chemogenetics does not require the expensive light equipment, and therefore, is more accessible. The resolution in optogenetics declines due to light scattering and illuminance declined levels as the distance between the subject and the light source increases. These factors, therefore, don’t allow for all cells to be affected by light and lead to a lower spatial resolution. Chemogenetics, however, does not require light usage and therefore can achieve a higher spatial resolution.

== Applications ==
G-protein coupled receptors' usage and chemogenetics are nowadays the targets for many of the pharmaceutical companies to cure and alleviate symptoms of diseases that involve all tissues of the body. More specifically, DREADDs have been used to explore treatment options for various neurodegenerative and psychological conditions such as Parkinson’s disease, depression, anxiety, and addiction. These aforementioned conditions involve processes that occur within and outside of the nervous system involving neurotransmitters such as gamma-aminobutyric acid and glutamate. Chemogenetics has therefore been used in pharmacology to adjust the levels of such neurotransmitters in specific neuron while minimizing the side effects of treatment. To treat and relieve the symptoms of any disease using the DREADDs, these receptors are delivered to the area of interest via viral transduction.

Recently some studies have considered using a new method called retro DREADDs. This method allows specific neuronal pathways to be studied under cellular resolution. Unlike classic DREADDs, this method is usually used in wild type animals, and these receptors are given to the targeted cells via injection of two viral vectors.

=== Animal Models ===
DREADDS have been used in many animal models (e.g., mice and other non-primate animals) to target and influence the activity of various cells. Chemogenetics used in animals assists with demonstrating human disease models such as Parkinson's disease. Having this information allows scientists understand whether viral expression of DREADD proteins, both in-vivo enhancers and inhibitors of neuronal function can be used to bidirectionally affect the behaviors and the activity of the involved neurons. Recent studies have shown that DREADDs were successfully used to treat the motor deficits of rats modeling Parkinson's disease. Other studies have had successes linking the usage of DREADDs and influencing drug seeking and drug sensitization behavior.

The progression of chemogenetics from rodents to non-human primates has been slow due to increased demand in time and expense surrounding these projects. However, some recent studies in 2016 have been able to demonstrate successes showing that silencing the activity of neurons in the orbitofrontal cortex along with the removal of rhinal cortex, restricted the reward task performance in macaques.

Human Studies

The inhibitory DREADD hM4Di has recently been demonstrated in humans to reduce seizures by 92.6% following AAV-mediated transduction and activation by low-dose clozapine https://pubmed.ncbi.nlm.nih.gov/42981577/ There are at least 7 ongoing human trials employing DREADDs https://zendudest.substack.com/p/from-yeast-to-humans

== Limitation and future directions ==
Chemogenetics and usage of DREADDs have allowed researchers to advance in biomedical research areas including many neurodegenerative and psychiatric conditions. Chemogenetics have been used in these fields to induce specific and reversible brain lesions and therefore, study specific activities of neuron population. Although chemogenetics offers specificity and high spatial resolution, it still faces some challenges when used in investigating neuropsychiatric disorders. Neuropsychiatric disorders usually have a complex nature where lesions in the brain have not been identified as the main cause. Chemogenetics has been used to reverse some of the deficits revolving such conditions; however, it has not been able to identify the main cause of neuropsychiatric diseases and cure these conditions completely due to complex nature of these conditions. Nevertheless, chemogenetics has been used successfully in a preclinical model of drug-resistant epilepsy, where seizures arise from a discrete part of the brain. and also in humans with mesial temporal lobe epilepsy https://pubmed.ncbi.nlm.nih.gov/42981577/.

== See also ==
- Receptor activated solely by a synthetic ligand
