= Clozapine N-oxide =

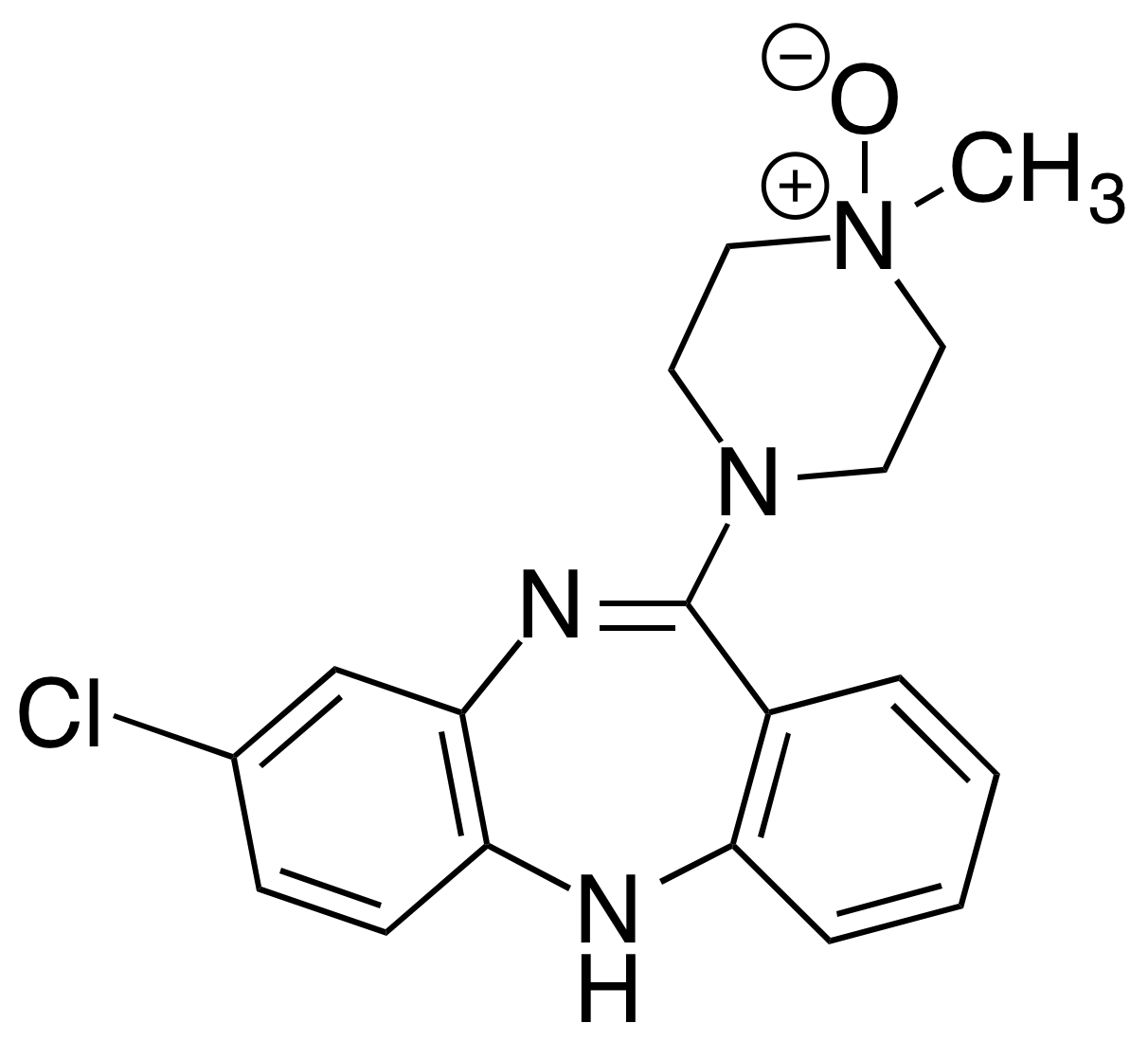

Names
- IUPAC name 3-chloro-6-(4-methyl-4-oxidopiperazin-4-ium-1-yl)-11H-benzo[b][1,4]benzodiazepine

Identifiers
CAS Number	34233-69-7
3D model (JSmol)	Interactive image
ChEMBL	ChEMBL1688
ChemSpider	21169512
ECHA InfoCard	100.164.243
PubChem CID	135445691
UNII	MZA8BK588J
CompTox Dashboard (EPA)	DTXSID50955778
- InChI: InChI=1S/C18H19ClN4O/c1-23(24)10-8-22(9-11-23)18-14-4-2-3-5-15(14)20-16-7-6-13(19)12-17(16)21-18/h2-7,12,20H,8-11H2,1H3 Key: OGUCZBIQSYYWEF-UHFFFAOYSA-N
- SMILES: C[N+]1(CCN(CC1)C2=NC3=C(C=CC(=C3)Cl)NC4=CC=CC=C42)[O-]

Properties
Chemical formula	C_{18}H_{19}ClN_{4}O
Molar mass	342.83 g·mol^{−1}

Hazards
- GHS labelling
Pictograms	(GHS06: Toxic) (GHS07: Exclamation mark)
Signal word	Danger
Hazard statements	H301, H315, H319, H335
Precautionary statements	P261, P264, P270, P271, P280, P301+P310, P302+P352, P304+P340, P305+P351+P338, P312, P321, P330, P332+P313, P337+P313, P362, P403+P233, P405, P501
- Except where otherwise noted, data are given for materials in their standard state (at 25 °C [77 °F], 100 kPa). Infobox references

Clozapine N-oxide (CNO) is a synthetic drug used mainly in biomedical research as a ligand to activate Designer Receptors Exclusively Activated by Designer Drugs (DREADDs), despite the initial belief that it was biologically inert. However, it has been shown to not enter the brain after administration and to reverse metabolize in peripheral tissues to form clozapine. Clozapine can bind to a number of different serotonergic, dopaminergic and adrenergic receptors within the brain. These off-target effects mean behavioral data using the CNO-DREADD system have to be interpreted with caution.

Alternatives to CNO with more affinity, more inert character, and faster kinetics include Compound 21 (C21) and deschloroclozapine (DCZ).
