= Receptor activated solely by a synthetic ligand =

Artificial biochemical receptors only responsive to predesigned drugs

A receptor activated solely by a synthetic ligand (RASSL) or designer receptor exclusively activated by designer drugs (DREADD), is a class of artificially engineered protein receptors used in the field of chemogenetics which are selectively activated by certain ligands. They are used in biomedical research, in particular in neuroscience to manipulate the activity of neurons.

Originally differentiated by the approach used to engineer them, RASSLs and DREADDs are often used interchangeably now to represent an engineered receptor-ligand system. These systems typically utilize G protein-coupled receptors (GPCR) engineered to respond exclusively to synthetic ligands, like clozapine N-oxide (CNO), and not to endogenous ligands. Several types of these receptors exists, derived from muscarinic or κ-opioid receptors.

== Types of RASSLs / DREADDs ==
One of the first DREADDs was based on the human M_{3} muscarinic receptor (hM_{3}). Only two point mutations of hM_{3} were required to achieve a mutant receptor with nanomolar potency for CNO, insensitivity to acetylcholine and low constitutive activity and this DREADD receptor was named hM3Dq. M_{1} and M_{5} muscarinic receptors have been mutated to create DREADDs hM1Dq and hM5Dq respectively.

The most commonly used inhibitory DREADD is hM4Di, derived from the M_{4} muscarinic receptor that couples with the G_{i} protein. Another G_{i} coupled human muscarinic receptor, M_{2}, was also mutated to obtain the DREADD receptor hM2D. Another inhibitory G_{i}-DREADD is the kappa-opioid-receptor (KOR) DREADD (KORD) which is selectively activated by salvinorin B (SalB).

G_{s}-coupled DREADDs have also been developed. These receptors are also known as G_{s}D and are chimeric receptors containing intracellular regions of the turkey erythrocyte β-adrenergic receptor substituted into the rat M_{3} DREADD.

== RASSL / DREADD ligands ==
A growing number of ligands that can be used to activate RASSLs / DREADDs are commercially available.

CNO is the prototypical DREADD activator. CNO activates the excitatory Gq- coupled DREADDs: hM3Dq, hM1Dq and hM5Dq and also the inhibitory hM4Di and hM2Di G_{i}-coupled DREADDs. CNO also activates the G_{s}-coupled DREADD (GsD) and the β-arrestin preferring DREADD: rM3Darr (Rq(R165L).

Recent findings suggest that systemically administered CNO does not readily cross the blood-brain-barrier in vivo and converts to clozapine which itself activates DREADDs. Clozapine is an atypical antipsychotic which has been indicated to show high DREADD affinity and potency. Subthreshold injections of clozapine itself can be utilised to induce preferential DREADD-mediated behaviors. Therefore, when using CNO, care must be taken in experimental design and proper controls should be incorporated.

DREADD agonist 21, also known as Compound 21, represents an alternative agonist for muscarinic-based DREADDs and an alternative to CNO. It has been reported that Compound 21 has excellent bioavailability, pharmacokinetic properties and brain penetrability and does not undergo reverse metabolism to clozapine. Another known agonist is perlapine, a hypnotic drug approved for treating insomnia in Japan. It acts as an activator of G_{q}-, G_{i}-, and G_{s} DREADDs that has structural similarity to CNO. A more recent agonist of hM3Dq and hM4Di is deschloroclozapine (DCZ).

On the other hand, SalB B is a potent and selective activator of KORD.

JHU37160 and JHU37152 have been marketed commercially as novel DREADD ligands, active in vivo, with high potency and affinity for hM3Dq and hM4Di DREADDs.

Dihydrochloride salts of DREADD ligands that are water-soluble (but with differing stabilities in solution) have also been commercially developed (see for aqueous stability).

== Mechanism ==
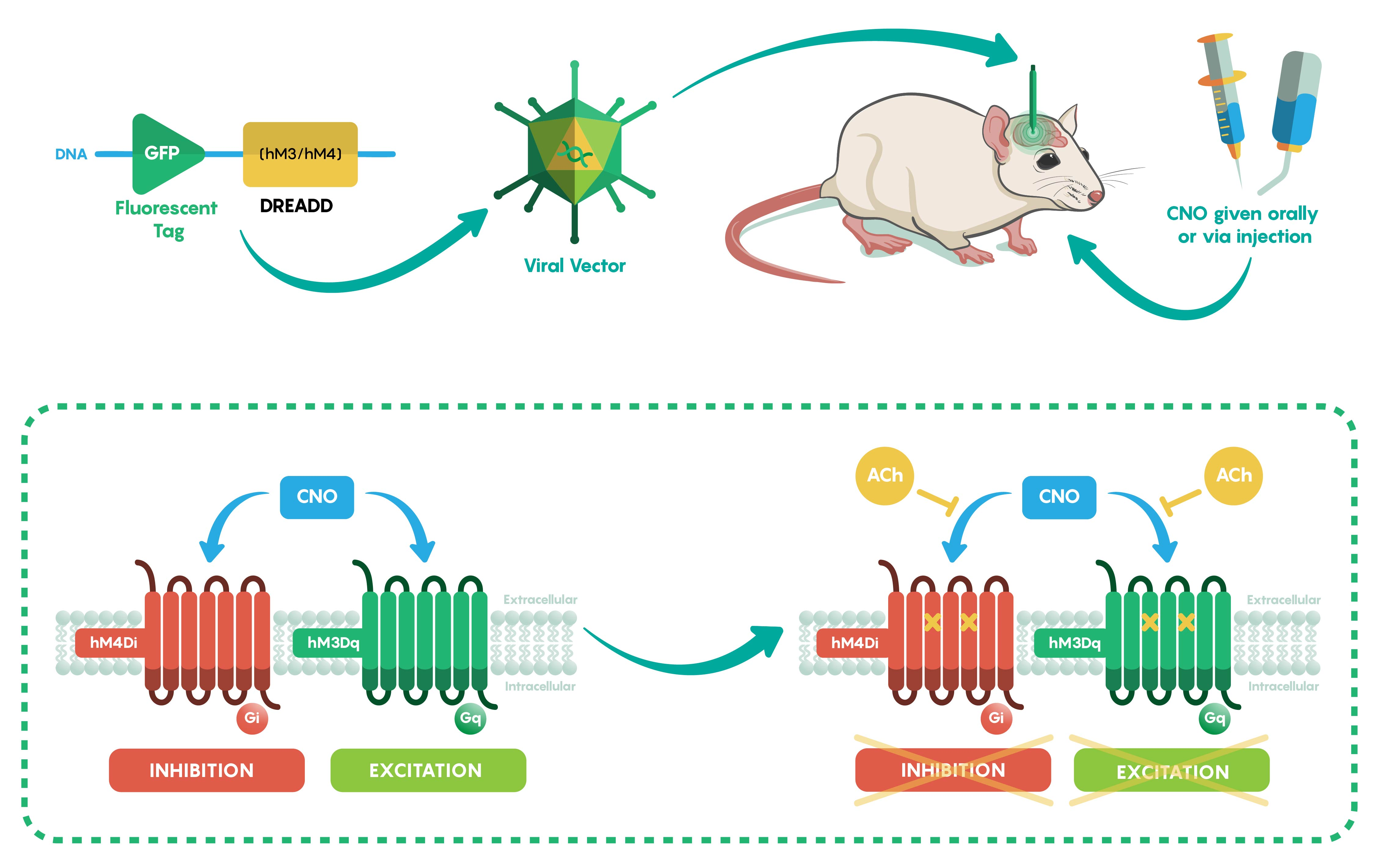
Schematic overview of how different variants of DREADDs (hM3Dq and hM4Di) can be used to activate and also inhibit groups of neurons using CNO.

RASSLs and DREADDs are families of designer G-protein-coupled receptors (GPCRs) built specifically to allow for precise spatiotemporal control of GPCR signaling in vivo. These engineered GPCRs are unresponsive to endogenous ligands but can be activated by nanomolar concentrations of pharmacologically inert, drug-like small molecules. Currently, RASSLs exist for the interrogation of several GPCR signaling pathways, including those activated by Gs, Gi, Gq, Golf and β-arrestin. A major cause for success of RASSL resources has been open exchange of DNA constructs, and RASSL related resources.

hM4Dq-DREADD signals through Gαq/11 G-protein by stimulating phosphlipase C which triggers release calcium from intracellular stores.

Inhibitory effects of hM4Di-DREADD are a result of the CNO's stimulation which results in inhibition of adenylate cyclase and cAMP. This leads to activation of the G-protein inwardly rectifying potassium (GIRK) channels. This causes hyperpolarization of the targeted neuronal cell and thus attenuates subsequent activity.

Gs-DREADDs acts through Gαs G-protein which increases cAMP concentration in cells.

== Uses ==
This chemogenetic technique can be used for remote manipulation of cells, in particular excitable cells like neurons, both in vitro and in vivo with the administration of specific ligands. Similar techniques in this field include thermogenetics and optogenetics, the control of neurons with temperature or light, respectively.

Viral expression of DREADD proteins, both in-vivo enhancers and inhibitors of neuronal function, have been used to bidirectionally control behaviors in mice (e.g odor discrimination). Due to their ability to modulate neuronal activity, DREADDs are used as a tool to evaluate both the neuronal pathways and behaviors associated with drug-cues and drug addiction.

== History ==
Conklin and colleagues designed the first GPCR which could be activated only by a synthetic compound and has gradually been gaining momentum. The first international RASSL meeting was scheduled for April 6, 2006. A simple example of the use of a RASSL system in behavioral genetics was illustrated by Mueller et al. (2005) where they showed that expressing a RASSL receptor in sweet taste cells of the mouse tongue led to a strong preference for oral consumption of the synthetic ligand, whereas expressing the RASSL in bitter taste cells caused dramatic taste aversion for the same compound.

The attenuating effects of the hM4Di-DREADD were originally explored in 2007, before being confirmed in 2014.
