= Iris Sommer =

Dutch psychiatrist

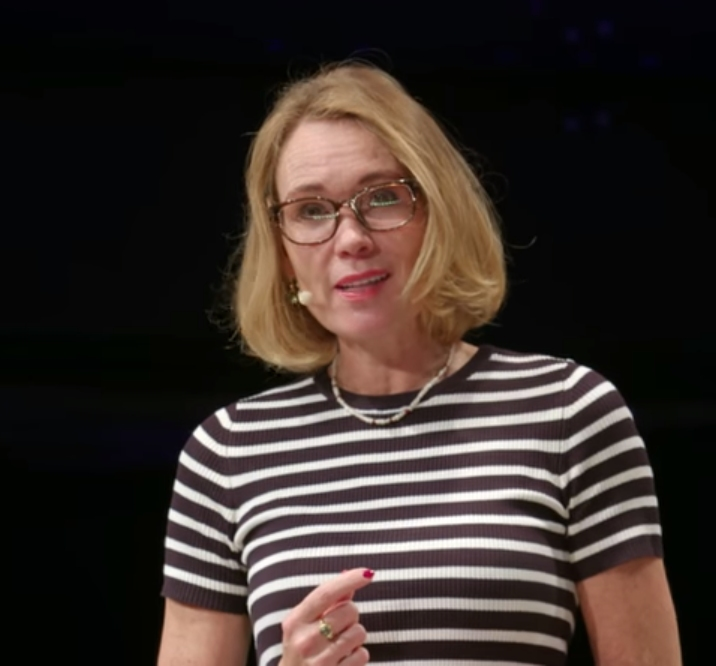
- Sommer in 2016
- Born: Iris Else Clara Sommer; 31 August 1970 (age 56); Roermond, Netherlands
- Education: Utrecht University
- Spouse: Robert Schoevers
- Children: 2
- Scientific career
- Fields: Psychiatry
- Workplaces: University Medical Center Groningen
- Thesis: Language lateralization in schizophrenia (2004)
- Doctoral advisor: René Kahn

Iris Sommer (born 31 August 1970) is a Dutch psychiatrist who is professor of cognitive aspects of neurological and psychiatric disorders at the Departments of Neuroscience of University Medical Center Groningen. She previously served as Professor of Psychiatry at the University Medical Center Utrecht beginning in 2011. She received her PhD cum laude from Utrecht University in 2004. She was elected as a member of the Young Academy of the Royal Dutch Academy of Sciences. She and her husband, Robert Schoevers, have two children.
