= Summers (surname) =

Summers is a surname, and may refer to the following people:

== People ==
=== In academia ===
- Clyde Summers (1918–2010), American labor lawyer and law professor at the University of Pennsylvania Law School
- David Summers (art historian), American art historian
- Harry G. Summers, Jr. (1932–1999), American army Colonel and author about the Vietnam War
- Lawrence Summers (born 1954), American economist and former president of Harvard University
- Max D. Summers (born 1939), American molecular biologist
- Robert Summers (economist) (1922–2012), American economist
- Robert S. Summers (1933–2019), American academic
- Vera Summers (1899-?), Australian high school teacher and principal

=== In arts and entertainment ===
==== Music ====
- Andrew Rowan Summers (1912–1968), American folk singer
- Andy Summers (born 1942), English guitarist
- Bill Summers (musician) (born 1948), American jazz percussionist
- David Summers Rodríguez, Spanish musician and frontman of Hombres G
- Gene Summers (1939–2021), American recording artist
- Isabella Summers (born 1980), British musician
- John "Dick" Summers (1887–1976), fiddler from Indiana
- Jonathan Summers (born 1946), Australian baritone
- Steve Summers, American lead singer of the band Pretty Boy Floyd

==== Other arts ====
- Barbara Summers
- Dylan Summers (born 1973), American professional wrestler better known as Necro Butcher
- Henry Summers (actor), pseudonym used by Ed Wynn
- Hope Summers (1896–1979), American actress
- Jackie Summers, food writer
- Jeremy Summers (1931–2016), British film director
- Marc Summers (born 1951), American television personality
- Merna Summers (born 1933), Canadian short story writer
- Montague Summers (1880–1948), English author and clergyman
- Robert Summers (artist) (born 1940), American painter and sculptor

=== In government and politics ===
- Amy Summers (born 1963), American state representative from West Virginia
- David Summers (diplomat), Canadian High Commissioner to Malaysia
- George W. Summers (1804–1868), American politician
- Glenn E. Summers (1925–2020), American lawyer, judge, and politician
- Henry Summers (civil servant)
- John W. Summers (1870–1937), American politician
- John Summers (Tennessee politician) from Metropolitan Council

=== In sport ===
- Bill Summers (umpire) (1895–1966), American umpire
- Champ Summers (1946–2012), American baseball player
- DaJuan Summers (born 1988), American Basketball Player
- Ed Summers (1884–1953), American baseball player
- Freddie Summers (1947–1994), American football player
- Jamar Summers (born 1995), American football player
- John Summers (figure skater) (born 1957), American ice dancer
- John Summers (footballer) (1915–1991), English footballer
- John Summers (sport shooter), Australian Olympic sport shooter
- Johnny Summers (footballer) (1927–1962), footballer for Charlton Athletic
- Johnny Summers (boxer) (1882–1946), English boxer
- Richard Summers (1860–1941), Wales rugby union international
- Robert Summers (born 2002), South African badminton player
- Sheila Piercey Summers (1919–2005), South African tennis player
- Ty Summers (born 1996), American football player

=== In other fields ===
- Anthony Summers, Irish author and journalist
- Bill Summers (car builder) (1935–2011), American car builder and longtime speed record holder
- Obediah Summers (1844–1896), African American minister, Civil War veteran, chaplain
- John Summers & Sons, UK steel and iron producers
- John Summers (RAF officer) (1894–?), World War I flying ace
- Joseph Summers (1904–1954), British test pilot
- Montague Summers (1880–1948), English author and clergyman
- Sarah Rose Summers (born 1994), American beauty pageant titleholder and Miss USA 2018
- Vera Summers (born 1899), Australian high school teacher and principal

== Fictional characters ==
- Lenny Summers, character from Red Dead Redemption 2
- Mary Ann Summers, castaway on the television series Gilligan's Island
- Billy Summers, the main character from the titular character novel

=== Buffy the Vampire Slayer ===
- Buffy Summers, central character of the film and television series, Buffy the Vampire Slayer
- Dawn Summers, Buffy's sister
- Hank Summers, father of Buffy and Dawn Summers
- Joyce Summers, mother of Buffy and Dawn Summers

=== Marvel Comics ===
- Alex Summers, Havok of the X-Men
- Christopher Summers, Corsair, father of Scott, Alex and Gabriel Summers, former leader of the Starjammers
- Gabriel Summers, Vulcan, X-Man turned supervillain
- Hope Summers (character), first mutant born after M-Day
- Jean Grey-Summers, Phoenix of the X-Men
- Nathan Summers, Cable of the X-Men
- Rachel Summers, Marvel Girl of the X-Men and Excalibur
- Ruby Summers, daughter of Scott Summers and Emma Frost
- Scott Summers, Cyclops, leader of the X-Men

== See also ==
- Ann Summers, a British retail chain of sex toys and lingerie
- Henry Summers (disambiguation)
- Sommers (surname)
- Sumners, surname
