= Tom McCormick (boxer) =

Irish boxer (1890–1916)

Personal information
- Nationality: British (Note: Every Irish born before 1922 is a British citizen. Ireland was part of the United Kingdom until 1922.)
- Born: Thomas McCormick; 8 August 1890 Dundalk, Ireland
- Died: 6 July 1916 (aged 25) France
- Weight: Lightweight; Welterweight

Boxing career

Boxing record
- Total fights: 41
- Wins: 29
- Win by KO: 17
- Losses: 10
- Draws: 2

Thomas McCormick (8 August 1890 – 6 July 1916) was an Irish professional boxer. Competing from 1911 to 1915, he held the British and Empire welterweight titles in 1914.

== Boxing career highlights ==
On 9 January 1914 McCormick took the British Commonwealth and British Welterweight Title from Johnny Summers in twenty rounds in Sydney, Australia. He lost the title on 21 March 1914 to South London born Jewish boxer Mat Wells in twenty rounds, again in Sydney, Australia. Wells had been a British Lightweight champion and an Olympic Boxing contender who made it to the semi-finals in London in the summer of 1916.

On 24 January 1914 he took the World Welterweight title from Waldemar Holberg at Baker's Pavilion in Melbourne, Australia.

On 10 May 1915 McCormick made another attempt at the British Welterweight title at the National Sporting Club, Covent Garden in London, but lost to title holder Johnny Basham in a hard fought thirteenth round TKO.

== Death in World War I ==
McCormick was killed in action on 6 July 1916 while serving in the 12th battalion of the Manchester Regiment in France during World War I.

His grave is unknown and his name is inscribed on the Thiepval Memorial to the Missing, Pier and Face 13 A and 14 C.

== Professional boxing record ==
| 41 fights | 29 wins | 10 losses |
|---|---|---|
| By knockout | 17 | 3 |
| By decision | 9 | 6 |
| By disqualification | 3 | 1 |
| Draws | 2 | |

| No. | Result | Record | Opponent | Type | Round | Date | Location | Notes |
|---|---|---|---|---|---|---|---|---|
| 41 | Loss | 29–10–2 | Eddie Beattie | KO | 14 (20) | 11 Nov 1915 | St James Hall, Newcastle | |
| 40 | Loss | 29–9–2 | Albert Badoud | PTS | 15 | 2 Sep 1915 | Liverpool Stadium, Pudsey Street, Liverpool | |
| 39 | Win | 29–8–2 | Harry Paddon | TKO | 9 (10) | 2 Aug 1915 | Stamford Bridge, Chelsea | |
| 38 | Loss | 28–8–2 | Johnny Basham | TKO | 13 (20) | 5 May 1915 | Cosmopolitan Gymnasium, Plymouth | |
| 37 | Loss | 28–7–2 | Alex Costica | DQ | 10 (15) | 20 Nov 1914 | Cosmopolitan Gymnasium, Plymouth | |
| 36 | Loss | 28–6–2 | Milburn Saylor | RTD | 10 (20) | 18 Apr 1914 | Melbourne Stadium, Melbourne | |
| 35 | Loss | 28–5–2 | Fritz Holland | PTS | 20 | 28 Mar 1914 | Melbourne Stadium, Melbourne | |
| 34 | Loss | 28–4–2 | Matt Wells | PTS | 20 | 21 Mar 1914 | Sydney Stadium, Sydney | Lost world welterweight title |
| 33 | Win | 28–3–2 | Johnny Summers | KO | 1 (20) | 14 Feb 1914 | Sydney Stadium, Sydney | Retained world welterweight title |
| 32 | Win | 27–3–2 | Waldemar Holberg | DQ | 6 (20) | 24 Jan 1914 | Baker's Pavilion, Melbourne | Won world welterweight title |
| 31 | Win | 26–3–2 | Johnny Summers | PTS | 20 | 10 Jan 1914 | Sydney Stadium, Sydney | |
| 30 | Loss | 25–3–2 | Gus Platts | PTS | 20 | 8 Sep 1913 | Artillery Drill Hall, Sheffield | |
| 29 | Win | 25–2–2 | Alf Goodwin | TKO | 6 (15) | 3 Sep 1913 | Cosmopolitan Gymnasium, Plymouth | |
| 28 | Win | 24–2–2 | Eddie Beattie | PTS | 15 | 15 Aug 1913 | Cosmopolitan Gymnasium, Plymouth | |
| 27 | Draw | 23–2–2 | Johnny Basham | PTS | 15 | 31 Jul 1913 | Liverpool Stadium, Pudsey Street, Liverpool | |
| 26 | Win | 23–2–1 | Eddie Elton | RTD | 5 (15) | 18 Jul 1913 | Cosmopolitan Gymnasium, Plymouth | |
| 25 | Win | 22–2–1 | Tom Tees | DQ | 3 (15) | 27 Jun 1913 | Cosmopolitan Gymnasium, Plymouth | |
| 24 | Win | 21–2–1 | Albert Badoud | PTS | 15 | 21 May 1913 | Plymouth Albion Football Ground, Plymouth | |
| 23 | Win | 20–2–1 | Gus Platts | PTS | 20 | 21 Apr 1913 | National Sporting Club, Covent Garden | |
| 22 | Win | 19–2–1 | Arthur Evernden | PTS | 15 | 3 Mar 1913 | National Sporting Club, Covent Garden | |
| 21 | Win | 18–2–1 | Albert Badoud | PTS | 15 | 8 Feb 1913 | Wonderland, Paris | |
| 20 | Win | 17–2–1 | Sid Burns | KO | 7 (10) | 17 Jan 1913 | Cosmopolitan Gymnasium, Plymouth | |
| 19 | Win | 16–2–1 | Young Joseph | PTS | 15 | 29 Nov 1912 | Cosmopolitan Gymnasium, Plymouth | |
| 18 | Win | 15–2–1 | Jack Goldswain | PTS | 20 | 8 Nov 1912 | Cosmopolitan Gymnasium, Plymouth | |
| 17 | Draw | 14–2–1 | Jack Goldswain | PTS | 15 | 18 Oct 1912 | Cosmopolitan Gymnasium, Plymouth | |
| 16 | Win | 14–2 | Harry Duncan | DQ | 9 (15) | 11 Sep 1912 | Cosmopolitan Gymnasium, Plymouth | |
| 15 | Win | 13–2 | Boss Edwards | RTD | 2 (15) | 23 Aug 1912 | Cosmopolitan Gymnasium, Plymouth | |
| 14 | Win | 12–2 | Dick Knock | RTD | 6 (15) | 9 Aug 1912 | Cosmopolitan Gymnasium, Plymouth | |
| 13 | Win | 11–2 | Jack Meekins | RTD | 4 (15) | 26 Jul 1912 | Cosmopolitan Gymnasium, Plymouth | |
| 12 | Win | 10–2 | Battling Taylor | RTD | 7 (15) | 5 Jul 1912 | Cosmopolitan Gymnasium, Plymouth | |
| 11 | Win | 9–2 | Pete Marks | KO | 1 (10) | 21 Jun 1912 | Cosmopolitan Gymnasium, Plymouth | |
| 10 | Win | 8–2 | Albert Bayton | KO | 2 (15) | 20 May 1912 | New City BC, Sheffield | |
| 9 | Win | 7–2 | Albert Bayton | TKO | 10 (15) | 4 Mar 1912 | National Sporting Club, Covent Garden | |
| 8 | Win | 6–2 | Pete Walker | KO | 1 (?) | 1 Feb 1912 | Location Unknown | |
| 7 | Win | 5–2 | Private Harry Hutton | KO | 6 (10) | 20 Jan 1912 | The Ring, Blackfriars Road Matinee, Southwark | |
| 6 | Win | 4–2 | Bill Mansell | KO | 3 (6) | 15 Jan 1912 | National Sporting Club, Covent Garden | |
| 5 | Loss | 3–2 | Private Harry Hutton | PTS | 3 | 19 Oct 1911 | Connaught Drill Hall, Portsmouth | |
| 4 | Win | 3–1 | Private Teale | PTS | 3 | 18 Oct 1911 | Connaught Drill Hall, Portsmouth | |
| 3 | Win | 2–1 | Seaman White | KO | 1 (3) | 10 Apr 1911 | National Sporting Club, Covent Garden | |
| 2 | Loss | 1–1 | Sapper Jack O'Neill | PTS | 3 | 10 Apr 1911 | National Sporting Club, Covent Garden | |
| 1 | Win | 1–0 | Private O'Keefe | RTD | 2 (3) | 6 Apr 1911 | National Sporting Club, Covent Garden | |

== See also ==
- Lineal championship
- List of welterweight boxing champions

== Major titles ==
Achievements
| Preceded by Johnny Summers | British Empire welterweight champion 9 January 1914 – 21 March 1914 | Succeeded by Matt Wells |
| Preceded by Johnny Summers | British welterweight champion 9 January 1914 – 21 March 1914 | Succeeded by Matt Wells |
| Preceded by Waldemar Holberg | World welterweight champion 24 January 1914 – 21 March 1914 | Succeeded by Matt Wells |
