= John Summers =

John Summers may refer to:

- John W. Summers (1870–1937), U.S. politician
- John Summers (figure skater) (born 1957), American ice dancer
- John Summers (footballer) (1915–1991), English footballer who played for Leicester City, Derby County and Southampton
- John Summers (sport shooter) (born 1957), Australian Olympic sport shooter
- John Summers & Sons, UK steel and iron producers
- John Summers (RAF officer) (1894–?), World War I flying ace
- John "Dick" Summers (1887–1976), old-time fiddler from Indiana
- John Summers (bowls), Scottish lawn and indoor bowler
- John Summers (Tennessee politician) from Metropolitan Council
- John Summers (curler) in the 2011 World Senior Curling Championships – Men's tournament

== See also ==
- John Summers High School, Deeside, Flintshire, North Wales, UK
- Johnny Summers (disambiguation)
- John Sommers, American football
- John Somers (disambiguation)
