= List of aerial victories of Lothar von Richthofen =

Lothar von Richthofen, younger brother of Red Baron Manfred von Richthofen, was a German flying ace credited with 40 confirmed victories in just 77 days flying combat. As the primary arena for aerial combat on the Western Front was over the German trenches and rear works, German aerial and ground observers could usually verify German victories such as Lothar's in considerable detail. The aviation historians cited have further researched his victory claims.

== List of victories ==
Confirmed victories in this list are numbered and listed chronologically. Listings of single casualties are obviously of pilots. In victories over an air crew, pilot casualties are listed first, then the observer(s).

This list is complete for entries, though obviously not for all details. Abbreviations from sources utilized were expanded by editor creating this list. Sources: Norman Franks, Frank Bailey, Russell Guest (1993). Above the Lines: The Aces and Fighter Units of the German Air Service, Naval Air Service and Flanders Marine Corps, 1914–1918. Grub Street Publishing, London. ISBN 0-948817-73-9, ISBN 978-0-948817-73-1, pp. 186–187; Norman Franks, Hal Giblin (2003), Under the Guns of the German Aces, Grub Street, London. ISBN 1-898697-72-8 ISBN 978-1-898697-72-5, pp. 135–187

No.	Date	Time	Foe	Squadron	Location	Casualties
1	28 March 1917	1720 hours	Royal Aircraft Factory F.E.2b	No. 25 Squadron RFC	East of Vimy, France	Norman Leslie Knight WIA POW
2	11 April 1917	0915 hours	Bristol F.2 Fighter	No. 48 Squadron RFC	North of Fresnes, France	George Norman Brockhurst WIA POW; Cecil Blockley Boughton POW
3	11 April 1917	1235 hours	Royal Aircraft Factory B.E.2e	No. 8 Squadron RFC	Northeast of Fampoux, France	George Tod Morris KIA; James Mitchell Souter KIA
4	13 April 1917	1855 hours	Royal Aircraft Factory RE.8	No. 59 Squadron RFC	Northeast of Biache, France	George Bailey Hodgson KIA; Charles Herbert Morris KIA
5	13 April 1917	1856 hours	Royal Aircraft Factory RE.8	No. 59 Squadron RFC	Pelves, France	Herbert George MacMillan Horne KIA; William Joseph Chalk KIA
6	14 April 1917	0920 hours	Nieuport 23	No. 60 Squadron RFC	East of Fouquières-lès-Lens, France	Alan Binnie WIA POW
7	14 April 1917	1823 hours	SPAD S.7	No. 19 Squadron RFC	Southeast of Vimy, France	John Watson Baker WIA (crashed behind British lines)
8	16 April 1917	1030 hours	Nieuport 17	No. 60 Squadron RFC	South of Rouex	David Norman Robertson KIA
9	21 April 1917	1728 hours	Nieuport 17	No. 29 Squadron RFC	Southeast of Vimy, France	Alan Bertram Morgan POW, DOW
10	23 April 1917	1210 hours	Royal Aircraft Factory B.E.2g	No. 16 Squadron RFC	North of Vimy, France	Charles Maurice Crow KIA; Eustace Thomas Turner WIA
11	26 April 1917	1840 hours	Royal Aircraft Factory F.E.2g	No. 16 Squadron RFC	Southeast of Vimy Ridge, France	William Samuel Spence KIA; William Archibald Campbell KIA
12	27 April 1917	2015 hours	Royal Aircraft Factory F.E.2b	No. 11 Squadron RFC	Fresnes, France	John Arthur Cairns POW; E. G. Perry POW
13	29 April 1917	1215 hours	SPAD S.7	No. 19 Squadron RFC	Izel-lès-Équerchin, France	William Norton Hamilton POW
14	29 April 1917	1925 hours	Royal Aircraft Factory B.E.2e	No. 12 Squadron RFC	Northeast of Monchy, France	Cyril John Pile KIA; John Howard Westlake KIA
15	30 April 1917	0715 hours	Royal Aircraft Factory B.E.2g	No. 16 Squadron RFC	Southeast of Vimy, France	Norm, an Alan Lawrence KIA; George Ronald Yorston Stout KIA
16	30 April 1917	0755 hours	Royal Aircraft Factory FE.2d	No. 57 Squadron RFC	Izel-lès-Equerchin, France	Percy Thomas Bowers POW; Samuel Torton Wills POW
17	1 May 1917	1900 hours	Royal Aircraft Factory FE.2d	No. 25 Squadron RFC	West of Acheville, France	Berry King; H. G. Taylor WIA (crashed behind British lines)
18	6 May 1917	1050 hours	Royal Aircraft Factory RE.8	No. 16 Squadron RFC	Farbus, France	Clifford Sanderson WIA; Harry Kovrigin Lytton (landed behind British lines)
19	7 May 1917	1830 hours	Nieuport 17	No. 40 Squadron RFC	West of Biache-Saint-Vaast, France	Cecil Stanley Gastain KIA
20	7 May 1917	2030 hours	Royal Aircraft Factory SE.5a	No, 56 Squadron RFC	Annoeullin, France	False confirmation of Albert Ball for propaganda purposes
21	9 May 1917	1830 hours	Bristol F.2 Fighter	No. 48 Squadron RFC	Northeast of Fampoux, France	William Thomas Price WIA; Charles Geoffrey Claye WIA (crashed behind British lines)
22	10 May 1917	0750 hours	Sopwith Pup	No. 66 Squadron RFC	South of Vitry, France	Daniel Joseph Sheehan KIA
23	11 May 1917	1710 hours	Bristol F.2 Fighter	No. 48 Squadron RFC	Izel-lès-Equerchin, France	Ace William Otto Brash Winkler POW; Ace Ernest Stanley Moore POW
24	13 May 1917	1135 hours	Royal Aircraft Factory BE.2e	No. 5 Squadron RFC	West of Fresnoy, France	Frank Thomson; Arthur Charles Champion Rawlins (crashed behind British lines)
25	9 November 1917	1030 hours	Bristol F.2 Fighter	No. 11 Squadron RFC	Northwest of Zonnebeke, Belgium	No British losses reported
26	23 November 1917	1400 hours	Bristol F.2 Fighter	No. 11 Squadron RFC	West of Seranvillers, France	Erland Dauria Perney KIA; Ewan John Blackledge KIA
27	11 March 1918	1100 hours	Bristol F.2 Fighter	No. 48 Squadron RFC	Northeast of Fresnoy, France	Wynne Llewellyn Thomas; J. H. Bowler (returned to base)
28	12 March 1918	1100 hours	Bristol F.2 Fighter	No. 62 Squadron RFC	Maretz, France	Douglas Stewart Kennedy KIA; Hugh Goddard Gill KIA
29	12 March 1918	1110 hours	Bristol F.2 Fighter	No. 62 Squadron RAF	Clary, Nord, France	Cyril Boyd Fenton POW; Henry Basil Pridden Boyce POW
30	25 July 1918	1950 hours	Sopwith Camel	No. 73 Squadron RAF	Fismes, France	Unknown
31 and 32	1 August 1918	1310 hours	Two SPAD S.7s			German pilots claimed six victories. French lost two SPADs.
33	8 August 1918	1730 hours	Airco DH.9	No. 49 Squadron RAF	Vicinity of Perrone, France	George Strachan Ramsay KIA; Walter Noel Hartley KIA
34	8 August 1918	1745 hours	Royal Aircraft Factory SE.5a	No. 60 Squadron RAF	Near Estrées, France	James Grantley Hall
35	8 August 1918	1830 hours	Royal Aircraft Factory SE.5a	No. 1 Squadron RAF	Vicinity of Perrone, France	Kenneth Charles Mills KIA
36	9 August 1918	0730 hours	Airco DH.9	No. 107 Squadron RAF	Villers-Carbonnel, France	William Henry Dore KIA; John Ewing Wallace KIA
37	9 August 1918	1840 hours	Airco DH.9	No. 107 Squadron RAF	Foucaucourt, France	Alexander John Mayo KIA; Joseph Wesson Jones MIA
38	11 August 1918	0830 hours	Airco DH.9	No. 98 Squadron RAF		Brian Charles Geary KIA; Edward Henry Edgell KIA
39	12 August 1918	0930 hours	Sopwith Camel	No. 209 Squadron RAF	Northwest of Peronne, France	Ace Kenneth MacKenzie Walker KIA
40	12 August 1918	0930 hours	Sopwith Camel	No. 209 Squadron RAF	Misery, Somme, France	Ace John Kenneth Summers
