= Johnny Summers =

Johnny Summers may refer to:

- Johnny Summers (footballer) (1927–1962), footballer for Charlton Athletic
- Johnny Summers (boxer) (1882–1946), English boxer

== See also ==
- John Summers (disambiguation)
