= Dixie Kid =

American boxer (1883–1934)

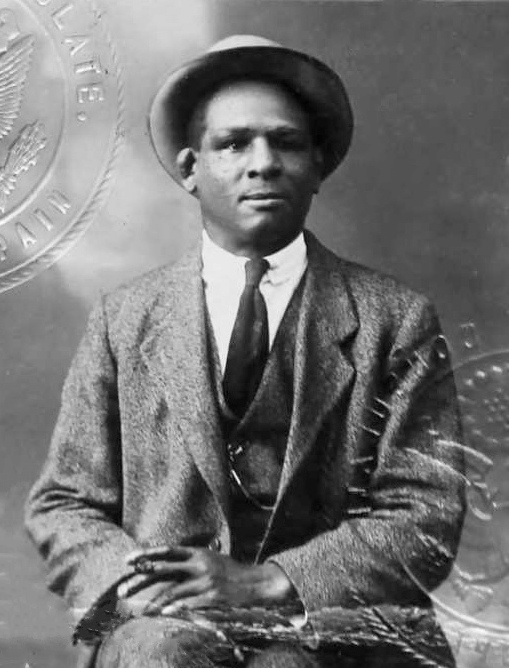
- Passport photo of Dixie Kid from 1919

Personal information
- Born: Aaron Lister Brown; December 23, 1883 Fulton, Missouri, U.S.
- Died: April 6, 1934 (aged 50) Los Angeles, California, U.S.
- Height: 5 ft 8 in (1.73 m)
- Weight: Welterweight

Boxing career

Boxing record
- Total fights: 164; with the inclusion of newspaper decisions
- Wins: 92
- Win by KO: 59
- Losses: 45
- Draws: 21
- No contests: 6

Aaron Lister Brown (23 December 1883 – 6 April 1934), known professionally as the Dixie Kid, was an American boxer. He was a controversial contender for the World Welterweight Boxing Championship in April 1904.

== Early life and career ==
Brown was born on December 23, 1883, in Fulton, Missouri.

From 1900 to 1903, he fought almost exclusively in southern California, primarily in Los Angeles and Oakland, most notably defeating contender Frank McConnell in a fourth-round knockout on December 30, 1902, and Mose LaFontise with a tenth-round knockout on July 10, 1903. McConnell was a world welterweight championship contender against Mysterious Billy Smith in New York on January 26, 1900. The mute Butte, Montana based boxer LaFontise had just fought the great Joe Walcott before meeting the Kid, and had twice defeated Fireman Jim Flynn, the only boxer to ever knock out Jack Dempsey.

On May 21, 1903, the Kid defeated Al Neill in a twenty-round points decision in San Francisco. Neill was a welterweight contender who defeated Mysterious Billy Smith on a tenth round foul on January 23, 1902, and competed unsuccessfully for both the Middleweight and Welterweight championships of Australia in 1904-5.

== Professional career ==
=== Attempt at the world welterweight championship against Joe Walcott, 1904 ===
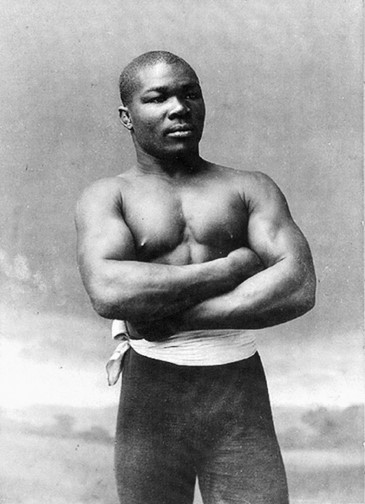
Barbados Joe Walcott

On April 29, 1904, Kid challenged Barbados Joe Walcott for the latter's World Welterweight Championship title. The Kid was down in the tenth round for a count of six. In the one sided contest, Walcott appeared to have a clear advantage in all but the seventh round. By the eleventh round, the tiring Kid began to clinch. Walcott was winning the fight handily when the referee disqualified him with no evident explanation in the final seconds of the 20th round. "Duck Sullivan", the referee who made the strange call of foul, was a last minute replacement, and Walcott protested the choice before the bout began. Many in the crowd were shocked with the decision, and Walcott himself was immediately angered at referee Sullivan who made the call. The match was disregarded as a title bout when it was discovered, not surprisingly, that referee Sullivan had bet on Dixie Kid to win the match.

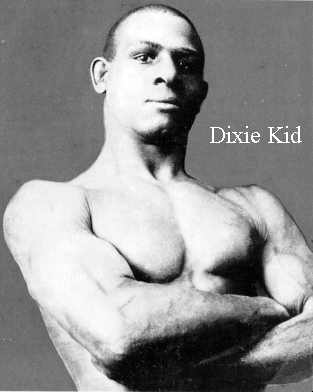
Dixie Kid in his prime

On September 28, 1909, he lost to World Colored Heavyweight Champion Sam Langford in Boston, Massachusetts, when the Kid's handlers threw in the towel after the fifth round. Langford outweighed his opponent by at least twenty-five pounds. By most accounts, the "Kid" showed great cleverness in the bout eluding Langford's punches in the early rounds, and put up a skilled display of boxing in the close match. In the third round, the Kid nearly stopped Langford with a series of body blows, and short jabs to the face. As Langford gained his stride, the "Kid" went down once in the fifth round and again as the bell sounded, and could not return to box in the sixth when the towel was thrown.

On November 1, 1909, he faced the impressive black boxer Jeff Clark and fought to an eight-round win, which he repeated on November 15. In their fight of November 1, the bout was close for the first six rounds, but the Kid took the advantage in the seventh and knocked Clark to the mat at the end of the eighth, with the bell sounding before the count could be completed. Clark would later fight for championships in Panama City, Panama against such exceptional black opponents as Kid Norfolk, a future International Boxing Hall of Fame recipient, Roughouse Ware, and Sam McVea. Clark would take the Panamanian Heavyweight Title in May 1915.

=== Boxing in Europe 1910-20 ===
==== Impressive victory over Georges Carpentier in Paris, 1911 ====
On August 11, 1911, he defeated the formidable idol of France, Georges Carpentier, in a fifth-round technical knockout in Trouville. According to one source, Carpentier was taking a terrific beating. He later claimed he was not fully conditioned for the bout.

==== Loss to welterweight champion Harry Lewis in England, 1912 ====
Harry Lewis, Welterweight Champion

On January 18, 1912, he make a solid showing against world welterweight champion Harry Lewis, losing in an eighth-round technical knockout in a non-title fight in Liverpool, England. Lewis showed the advantage throughout the bout.

On October 4, 1912, in Premierland, Paris, he lost to Marcel Thomas in a fifteen-round points decision. The bout brought European world welterweight status to Thomas and had an impressive purse of $5000, equal to the better purses the Kid had split in the United States. The Kid had the best of the earlier rounds, but Thomas came back in the later ones.

On April 25, 1912, the Kid soundly defeated an eighteen year old Georges Bernard at France's grand Cirq de Paris, in an eleventh-round technical knockout. The bout was billed as the 147 pound world title, putting it in the welterweight class. About 1913, he trained Eugene Bullard as a boxer and arranged for him to fight in Paris. Bullard, an African-American, became a fighter pilot during World War I.

The Kid completed his boxing career in Europe, featuring bouts in France, England, and Spain.

In his career as both welterweight and middleweight, he fought such notable fighters as Jimmy Clabby, Frank Mantell, Larry Temple, Dave Holley, Young Peter Jackson, welterweight champion Mike "Twin" Sullivan, and black heavyweight contender Sam Langford

== Later life and death ==
Kid fought over 150 bouts and retired in 1920. In May 1922, he made a meager living playing the drum in an orchestra in Berlin, extending his European boxing tour after WWI and hoping to open a gymnasium. Near the end of his life in the summer of 1933 when Jimmy McLarnin became world welterweight champion, the Kid appeared at the young boxer's training camp, picking the junior welterweight as a rising star.

The Kid died April 6, 1934, in Los Angeles after falling out of a tenement story window. It is not known whether it was by accident or a suicide. Sadly, he lived near poverty at the time of his death, making ends meet with odd jobs and the occasional donation.

== Honours ==
Kid was inducted into the International Boxing Hall of Fame (2002). Nat Fleischer placed the Kid as the fifth best welterweight in boxing history. Herb Goldman ranked him as the sixteenth welterweight in boxing history. He was inducted into the Ring Boxing Hall of Fame in 1975.

== Primary boxing achievement ==
The following table shows the date of Dixie Kid's bout with Joe Walcott, April 29, 1904, though the bout was later disregarded as the referee Sullivan was found to have bet on the Kid. Dixie Kid's claim to the Welterweight Champion has since been disregarded by most boxing historians, as was his five-month claim to the title.

Achievements
Preceded by Barbados Joe Walcott	World Welterweight Champion; April 29, 1904 – September 1904; Disregarded	Vacant Title next held by William "Honey" Mellody

== Professional boxing record ==
All information in this section is derived from BoxRec, unless otherwise stated.

=== Official Record ===
164 fights	81 wins	35 losses
By knockout	59	6
By decision	19	26
By disqualification	3	3
Draws	15	
No contests	6	
Newspaper decisions/draws	27	

All newspaper decisions are officially regarded as "no decision" bouts and are not counted to the win/loss/draw column.

No.	Result	Record	Opponent	Type	Round	Date	Age	Location	Notes
164	Loss	81–35–15 (33)	Paul Buisson	PTS	12	Mar 14, 1920	36 years, 82 days	Casino de la Plage, Marseille, Bouches-du-Rhône, France	
163	Loss	81–34–15 (33)	Constant Pluyette	PTS	10	Jan 31, 1920	36 years, 39 days	Cirque de Paris, Paris, Paris, France	
162	Win	81–33–15 (33)	Rautal	KO	2 (?)	Oct 24, 1919	35 years, 305 days	Teatro del Bosque, Barcelona, Cataluña, Spain	
161	Win	80–33–15 (33)	Frank Hoche	PTS	20	Jul 24, 1919	35 years, 213 days	Frontón Principal Palace, Barcelona, Cataluña, Spain	
160	Draw	79–33–15 (33)	Frank Hoche	PTS	15	Apr 23, 1919	35 years, 121 days	Iris Park, Barcelona, Cataluña, Spain	
159	Draw	79–33–14 (33)	Frank Hoche	PTS	15	Mar 7, 1918	34 years, 74 days	Iris Park, Barcelona, Cataluña, Spain	
158	Win	79–33–13 (33)	Tom Stokes	PTS	10	Jan 10, 1916	32 years, 18 days	London, England, U.K.	
157	Loss	78–33–13 (33)	Corporal Billy Fullerton	PTS	15	Dec 28, 1915	32 years, 5 days	The Ring, Blackfriars Road, Southwark, London, England, U.K.	
156	Loss	78–32–13 (33)	Dai Roberts	PTS	15	Nov 29, 1915	31 years, 341 days	The Ring, Blackfriars Road, Southwark, London, England, U.K.	
155	Win	78–31–13 (33)	Billy Williams	KO	7 (20)	Oct 25, 1915	31 years, 306 days	The Ring, Blackfriars Road, Southwark, London, England, U.K.	
154	Win	77–31–13 (33)	Liscombe Morland	TKO	12 (?)	Oct 4, 1915	31 years, 285 days	London, England, U.K.	
153	Win	76–31–13 (33)	Jack Morris	TKO	5 (10)	Jun 15, 1915	31 years, 174 days	The Ring, Blackfriars Road, Southwark, London, England, U.K.	
152	Win	75–31–13 (33)	Louis Verger	PTS	20	Jun 7, 1915	31 years, 166 days	London, England, U.K.	
151	Win	74–31–13 (33)	Tom Tees	TKO	15 (20)	May 17, 1915	31 years, 145 days	The Ring, Blackfriars Road, Southwark, London, England, U.K.	
150	Loss	73–31–13 (33)	Patsy Cokeley	PTS	20	Apr 3, 1915	31 years, 101 days	The Ring, Blackfriars Road, Southwark, London, England, U.K.	
149	Loss	73–30–13 (33)	Billy Williams	PTS	20	Mar 15, 1915	31 years, 82 days	London, England, U.K.	
148	Loss	73–29–13 (33)	Hippolyte Tyncke	PTS	20	Feb 15, 1915	31 years, 54 days	The Ring, Blackfriars Road, Southwark, London, England, U.K.	
147	Win	73–28–13 (33)	Johnny Horan	TKO	8 (?)	Jan 30, 1915	31 years, 38 days	London, England, U.K.	
146	Draw	72–28–13 (33)	Hippolyte Tyncke	PTS	20	Jan 25, 1915	31 years, 33 days	The Ring, Blackfriars Road, Southwark, London, England, U.K.	
145	Draw	72–28–12 (33)	Nicol Simpson	PTS	20	Jan 1, 1915	31 years, 9 days	London, England, U.K.	
144	Loss	72–28–11 (33)	Nicol Simpson	PTS	20	Dec 7, 1914	30 years, 349 days	The Ring, Blackfriars Road, Southwark, London, England, U.K.	
143	Win	72–27–11 (33)	Bill Bristowe	KO	2 (15)	Apr 6, 1914	30 years, 104 days	The Ring, Blackfriars Road, Southwark, London, England, U.K.	
142	Loss	71–27–11 (33)	Alf Wye	PTS	10	Apr 2, 1914	30 years, 100 days	Canterbury Music Hall, Lambeth, London, England, U.K.	
141	Win	71–26–11 (33)	Bill Bristowe	KO	2 (20)	Mar 30, 1914	30 years, 97 days	The Ring, Blackfriars Road, Southwark, London, England, U.K.	
140	Loss	70–26–11 (33)	Dick Nelson	PTS	20	Mar 28, 1914	30 years, 95 days	The Ring, Blackfriars Road, Southwark, London, England, U.K.	
139	Loss	70–25–11 (33)	Bill Bristowe	PTS	20	Mar 16, 1914	30 years, 83 days	The Ring, Blackfriars Road, Southwark, London, England, U.K.	
138	Win	70–24–11 (33)	Jim Rideout	TKO	8 (10)	Mar 9, 1914	30 years, 76 days	Acton Baths, Acton, London, England, U.K.	
137	Win	69–24–11 (33)	Fred Drummond	TKO	5 (?)	Mar 3, 1914	30 years, 70 days	London Palladium, West End, London, England, U.K.	
136	Draw	68–24–11 (33)	Tom Stokes	PTS	10	Feb 28, 1914	30 years, 67 days	The Ring, Blackfriars Road, Southwark, London, England, U.K.	
135	Win	68–24–10 (33)	Fireman George Anderson	KO	2 (20)	Jan 12, 1914	30 years, 20 days	Drill Hall, Birkenhead, Merseyside, England, U.K.	
134	Loss	67–24–10 (33)	Bandsman Jack Blake	PTS	20	Jan 1, 1914	30 years, 9 days	The Ring, Blackfriars Road, Southwark, London, England, U.K.	
133	Win	67–23–10 (33)	Fireman George Anderson	PTS	10	Dec 20, 1913	29 years, 362 days	The Ring, Blackfriars Road, Southwark, London, England, U.K.	
132	Win	66–23–10 (33)	Dick Nelson	PTS	20	Dec 8, 1913	29 years, 350 days	National Sporting Club, Covent Garden, London, England, U.K.	
131	Loss	65–23–10 (33)	Henri Demlen	PTS	15	Nov 28, 1913	29 years, 340 days	Élysée Montmartre, Paris, Paris, France	
130	Win	65–22–10 (33)	Dick Nelson	TKO	13 (20)	Nov 13, 1913	29 years, 325 days	National Sporting Club, Covent Garden, London, England, U.K.	
129	Win	64–22–10 (33)	Albert Scanlon	PTS	20	Oct 27, 1913	29 years, 308 days	National Sporting Club, Covent Garden, London, England, U.K.	
128	Win	63–22–10 (33)	Jack Goldswain	KO	4 (?)	Oct 13, 1913	29 years, 294 days	London, England, U.K.	
127	Loss	62–22–10 (33)	Private Jim Harris	PTS	10	Sep 22, 1913	29 years, 273 days	London, England, U.K.	
126	NC	62–21–10 (33)	Johnny Mathieson	NC	9 (20)	May 5, 1913	29 years, 133 days	St James Hall, Newcastle, Tyne and Wear, England, U.K.	The referee declared a no contest as both boxers were not doing their best
125	Loss	62–21–10 (32)	Jerry Thompson	RTD	1 (20)	Apr 10, 1913	29 years, 108 days	Liverpool Stadium, Pudsey Street, Liverpool, Merseyside, England, U.K.	Dixie twisted his ankle and retired
124	Loss	62–20–10 (32)	Johnny Mathieson	DQ	12 (20)	Mar 26, 1913	29 years, 93 days	Boulevard Rink, Leicester, Leicestershire, England, U.K.	
123	Win	62–19–10 (32)	Louis Verger	PTS	20	Mar 17, 1913	29 years, 84 days	The Ring, Blackfriars Road, Southwark, London, England, U.K.	
122	Win	61–19–10 (32)	Seaman Hulls	KO	4 (?)	Feb 28, 1913	29 years, 67 days	Cosmopolitan Gymnasium, Plymouth, Devon, England, U.K.	
121	Win	60–19–10 (32)	Jack Morris	KO	4 (20)	Feb 13, 1913	29 years, 52 days	Liverpool Stadium, Liverpool, Merseyside, England, U.K.	
120	Loss	59–19–10 (32)	Johnny Mathieson	PTS	20	Jan 13, 1913	29 years, 21 days	Stadium, Sparbrook, West Midlands, England, U.K.	
119	Win	59–18–10 (32)	Arthur Evernden	KO	9 (20)	Jan 2, 1913	29 years, 10 days	Liverpool Stadium, Pudsey Street, Liverpool, Merseyside, England, U.K.	
118	Win	58–18–10 (32)	Arthur Harman	TKO	9 (15)	Jan 1, 1913	29 years, 9 days	The Ring, Blackfriars Road, Southwark, London, England, U.K.	
117	Win	57–18–10 (32)	Jack Meekins	PTS	15	Dec 26, 1912	29 years, 3 days	The Ring, Blackfriars Road, Southwark, London, England, U.K.	
116	Win	56–18–10 (32)	Bob Reston	KO	3 (?)	Dec 7, 1912	28 years, 350 days	London, England, U.K.	
115	Draw	55–18–10 (32)	Johnny Mathieson	PTS	20	Nov 18, 1912	28 years, 331 days	The Ring, Blackfriars Road, Southwark, London, England, U.K.	
114	Draw	55–18–9 (32)	Jack Meekins	PTS	10	Nov 4, 1912	28 years, 317 days	The Ring, Blackfriars Road, Southwark, London, England, U.K.	
113	Loss	55–18–8 (32)	Johnny Mathieson	PTS	20	Oct 14, 1912	28 years, 296 days	The Ring, Blackfriars Road, Southwark, London, England, U.K.	
112	Loss	55–17–8 (32)	Marcel Thomas	PTS	15	Oct 4, 1912	28 years, 286 days	Élysée Montmartre, Paris, Paris, France	Lost world welterweight title "claim"
111	NC	55–16–8 (32)	Charlie Knock	NC	2 (20)	Aug 8, 1912	28 years, 229 days	Vickers' Sports Grounds, Carbrook, Yorkshire, England, U.K.	
110	Loss	55–16–8 (31)	Jack Morris	PTS	10	Jun 1, 1912	28 years, 161 days	Premierland, Whitechapel, London, England, U.K.	
109	Win	55–15–8 (31)	Wag Marshall	KO	3 (15)	May 25, 1912	28 years, 154 days	Pheasant Inn Grounds, Carbrook, Yorkshire, England, U.K.	
108	Loss	54–15–8 (31)	Dan Flynn	PTS	10	May 6, 1912	28 years, 135 days	Scottish National AC, Glasgow, Scotland, U.K.	
107	Win	54–14–8 (31)	George Gunther	DQ	15 (?)	May 2, 1912	28 years, 131 days	Liverpool Stadium, Pudsey Street, Liverpool, Merseyside, England, U.K.	
106	Win	53–14–8 (31)	Georges Bernard	TKO	11 (20)	Apr 24, 1912	28 years, 123 days	Cirque de Paris, Paris, Paris, France	Retained world welterweight title "claim"
105	Win	52–14–8 (31)	Harry Duncan	PTS	20	Apr 8, 1912	28 years, 107 days	The Ring, Blackfriars Road, Southwark, London, England, U.K.	
104	Win	51–14–8 (31)	Ted Lee	KO	4 (20)	Mar 18, 1912	28 years, 86 days	The Ring, Blackfriars Road, Southwark, London, England, U.K.	
103	Win	50–14–8 (31)	Young Johnny Johnson	RTD	3 (15)	Mar 9, 1912	28 years, 77 days	Drill Hall, Merthyr Tydfil, Wales, U.K.	
102	Win	49–14–8 (31)	Gunner James Durn	KO	6 (10)	Feb 17, 1912	28 years, 57 days	The Ring, Blackfriars Road, Southwark, London, England, U.K.	
101	Loss	48–14–8 (31)	Harry Lewis	TKO	8 (20)	Jan 18, 1912	28 years, 26 days	Liverpool Stadium, Pudsey Street, Liverpool, Merseyside, England, U.K.	
100	Win	48–13–8 (31)	Johnny Summers	KO	2 (20)	Nov 9, 1911	27 years, 321 days	Liverpool Stadium, Pudsey Street, Liverpool, Merseyside, England, U.K.	Retained world welterweight title "claim"
99	Win	47–13–8 (31)	Seaman Brown	KO	6 (?)	Sep 22, 1911	27 years, 273 days	Plymouth, Devon, England, U.K.	
98	Win	46–13–8 (31)	Georges Carpentier	TKO	5 (15)	Aug 19, 1911	27 years, 239 days	Trouville, Calvados, France	
97	NC	45–13–8 (31)	Harry Duncan	NC	6 (20)	Jul 10, 1911	27 years, 199 days	Rotunda Rink, Dublin, Ireland	Billed for world welterweight title "claim"
96	Loss	45–13–8 (30)	Blink McCloskey	DQ	3 (15)	Jul 3, 1911	27 years, 192 days	Wonderland, Whitechapel Road, Mile End, London, England, U.K.	
95	Win	45–12–8 (30)	Fred Stuber	KO	3 (?)	Jun 14, 1911	27 years, 173 days	Reims, Marne, France	
94	Win	44–12–8 (30)	Young Loughrey	DQ	10 (15)	May 20, 1911	27 years, 148 days	Cirque de Paris, Paris, Paris, France	Low blow
93	Loss	43–12–8 (30)	Willie Lewis	PTS	20	Apr 29, 1911	27 years, 127 days	Cirque de Paris, Paris, Paris, France	
92	ND	43–11–8 (30)	Kid Wilson	ND	10	Feb 13, 1911	27 years, 52 days	Harrison, New York, U.S.	
91	Loss	43–11–8 (29)	Bob Moha	NWS	10	Feb 10, 1911	27 years, 49 days	Miller's Hall, Buffalo, New York, U.S.	
90	Loss	43–11–8 (28)	Mike "Twin" Sullivan	NWS	10	Jan 17, 1911	27 years, 25 days	Harmonia Hall, Buffalo, New York, U.S.	
89	NC	43–11–8 (27)	Frank Mantell	NC	4 (12)	Nov 24, 1910	26 years, 336 days	Waterbury, Connecticut, U.S.	
88	Loss	43–11–8 (26)	Willie Lewis	NWS	10	Nov 17, 1910	26 years, 329 days	National S.C., New York City, New York, U.S.	
87	Win	43–11–8 (25)	Dennis Tighe	NWS	10	Oct 26, 1910	26 years, 307 days	Sharkey A.C., New York City, New York, U.S.	
86	Draw	43–11–8 (24)	Dick Nelson	NWS	10	Sep 19, 1910	26 years, 270 days	Olympia Boxing Club, New York City, New York, U.S.	
85	Win	43–11–8 (23)	Willie Lewis	NWS	10	Sep 9, 1910	26 years, 260 days	National S.C., New York City, New York, U.S.	
84	Draw	43–11–8 (22)	Joe Uvanni	NWS	10	Sep 5, 1910	26 years, 256 days	Casino A.C., Glens Falls, New York, U.S.	
83	Loss	43–11–8 (21)	Fighting Kennedy	NWS	10	Aug 19, 1910	26 years, 239 days	Lehigh A.C., New York City, New York, U.S.	
82	Win	43–11–8 (20)	Frank Mantell	NWS	10	Aug 1, 1910	26 years, 221 days	Olympia Boxing Club, New York City, New York, U.S.	
81	Win	43–11–8 (19)	George Cole	KO	4 (10)	Jul 20, 1910	26 years, 209 days	Sharkey A.C., New York City, New York, U.S.	
80	Win	42–11–8 (19)	Fighting Kennedy	TKO	8 (10)	Jul 11, 1910	26 years, 200 days	Olympia Boxing Club, New York City, New York, U.S.	
79	NC	41–11–8 (19)	Bill Hurley	NC	8 (10)	May 23, 1910	26 years, 151 days	Casino A.C., Glens Falls, New York, U.S.	
78	Win	41–11–8 (18)	Billy West	KO	4 (?)	May 19, 1910	26 years, 147 days	Sharkey A.C., New York City, New York, U.S.	
77	Loss	40–11–8 (18)	Jimmy Clabby	NWS	10	May 5, 1910	26 years, 133 days	Empire A.C., New York City, New York, U.S.	
76	Win	40–11–8 (17)	Joe Gaynor	KO	3 (?)	Apr 27, 1910	26 years, 125 days	Sharkey A.C., New York City, New York, U.S.	
75	Win	39–11–8 (17)	Jack Fitzgerald	NWS	10	Apr 20, 1910	26 years, 118 days	Sharkey A.C., New York City, New York, U.S.	
74	Win	39–11–8 (16)	Bill Hurley	NWS	10	Apr 5, 1910	26 years, 103 days	Casino A.C., Glens Falls, New York, U.S.	
73	Draw	39–11–8 (15)	Kid Henry	NWS	10	Mar 21, 1910	26 years, 88 days	Beaver A.C., Troy, New York, U.S.	
72	Loss	39–11–8 (14)	Kyle Whitney	PTS	8	Mar 15, 1910	26 years, 82 days	Armory, Boston, Massachusetts, U.S.	
71	Win	39–10–8 (14)	Bill Hurley	TKO	4 (10)	Mar 14, 1910	26 years, 81 days	Troy, New York, U.S.	
70	Win	38–10–8 (14)	Jack Fitzgerald	NWS	10	Mar 2, 1910	26 years, 69 days	Sharkey A.C., New York City, New York, U.S.	
69	Win	38–10–8 (13)	Jack Farrell	KO	9 (10)	Jan 26, 1910	26 years, 34 days	Sharkey A.C., New York City, New York, U.S.	
68	Loss	37–10–8 (13)	Sam Langford	KO	3 (8)	Jan 10, 1910	26 years, 18 days	Phoenix A.C., Memphis, Tennessee, U.S.	For world colored heavyweight title claim
67	Win	37–9–8 (13)	Christy Williams	KO	3 (?)	Dec 27, 1909	26 years, 4 days	Memphis, Tennessee, U.S.	
66	Win	36–9–8 (13)	Bert Whirlwind	KO	3 (8)	Nov 29, 1909	25 years, 341 days	Memphis, Tennessee, U.S.	
65	Win	35–9–8 (13)	Jeff Clark	PTS	8	Nov 15, 1909	25 years, 327 days	Memphis, Tennessee, U.S.	
64	Win	34–9–8 (13)	Jeff Clark	PTS	8	Nov 1, 1909	25 years, 313 days	Memphis, Tennessee, U.S.	
63	Win	33–9–8 (13)	Jack Gray	PTS	8	Oct 18, 1909	25 years, 299 days	Memphis, Tennessee, U.S.	
62	Win	32–9–8 (13)	Eugene Sims	KO	3 (?)	Oct 11, 1909	25 years, 292 days	Memphis, Tennessee, U.S.	
61	Loss	31–9–8 (13)	Sam Langford	RTD	5 (12)	Sep 28, 1909	25 years, 279 days	Armory, Boston, Massachusetts, U.S.	For world colored heavyweight title claim
60	Win	31–8–8 (13)	Battling Jack Johnson	KO	2 (?)	Sep 11, 1909	25 years, 262 days	New York City, New York, U.S.	
59	Win	30–8–8 (13)	Young Sam Langford	TKO	1 (?)	Sep 8, 1909	25 years, 259 days	Sharkey A.C., New York City, New York, U.S.	
58	Win	29–8–8 (13)	Mickey McDonough	NWS	10	Sep 1, 1909	25 years, 252 days	Sharkey A.C., New York City, New York, U.S.	
57	Win	29–8–8 (12)	Kid Williams	KO	4 (?)	Aug 25, 1909	25 years, 245 days	New York City, New York, U.S.	
56	Win	28–8–8 (12)	Sailor Cunningham	KO	5 (10)	Aug 18, 1909	25 years, 238 days	Sharkey A.C., New York City, New York, U.S.	
55	Win	27–8–8 (12)	Young Tommy Coleman	NWS	6	Oct 27, 1908	24 years, 309 days	Douglas A.C., Philadelphia, Pennsylvania, U.S.	
54	Loss	27–8–8 (11)	George Cole	NWS	6	Oct 17, 1908	24 years, 299 days	National A.C., Philadelphia, Pennsylvania, U.S.	
53	Win	27–8–8 (10)	Fighting Ghost	KO	2 (?)	Oct 8, 1908	24 years, 290 days	Highland Park, York, Pennsylvania, U.S.	
52	Win	26–8–8 (10)	Cub White	NWS	6	Sep 28, 1908	24 years, 280 days	West End A.C., Philadelphia, Pennsylvania, U.S.	
51	Win	26–8–8 (9)	Jeff Clark	NWS	6	Sep 24, 1908	24 years, 276 days	Broadway A.C., Philadelphia, Pennsylvania, U.S.	
50	Draw	26–8–8 (8)	Cub White	NWS	6	Sep 10, 1908	24 years, 262 days	Broadway A.C., Philadelphia, Pennsylvania, U.S.	
49	Loss	26–8–8 (7)	Ed Givens	NWS	6	Mar 6, 1906	22 years, 73 days	Business Men's Club, Pittsburgh, Pennsylvania, U.S.	
48	Draw	26–8–8 (6)	Joe Grim	NWS	6	Feb 17, 1905	21 years, 56 days	Maennerchor Hall, Lancaster, Pennsylvania, U.S.	
47	Loss	26–8–8 (5)	George Cole	NWS	6	Jan 7, 1905	21 years, 15 days	National A.C., Philadelphia, Pennsylvania, U.S.	
46	Draw	26–8–8 (4)	Larry Temple	PTS	15	Jan 2, 1905	21 years, 10 days	Germania Maennerchor Hall, Baltimore, Maryland, U.S.	
45	Draw	26–8–7 (4)	Young Peter Jackson	PTS	15	Dec 26, 1904	21 years, 3 days	Germania Maennerchor Hall, Baltimore, Maryland, U.S.	
44	Win	26–8–6 (4)	Dave Holly	NWS	6	Nov 25, 1904	20 years, 338 days	Manhattan A.C., Philadelphia, Pennsylvania, U.S.	
43	Loss	26–8–6 (3)	Philadelphia Jack O'Brien	NWS	6	Nov 12, 1904	20 years, 325 days	National A.C., Philadelphia, Pennsylvania, U.S.	
42	Draw	26–8–6 (2)	Larry Temple	NWS	6	Nov 5, 1904	20 years, 318 days	National A.C., Philadelphia, Pennsylvania, U.S.	
41	Loss	26–8–6 (1)	Dave Holly	NWS	6	Oct 15, 1904	20 years, 297 days	National A.C., Philadelphia, Pennsylvania, U.S.	
40	Win	26–8–6	Joe Grim	PTS	6	Oct 3, 1904	20 years, 285 days	Mount Clemens, Michigan, U.S.	
39	Win	25–8–6	Joe Grim	PTS	10	Sep 21, 1904	20 years, 273 days	Saginaw, Michigan, U.S.	
38	Win	24–8–6	John Dancer	KO	4 (?)	Jul 1, 1904	20 years, 191 days	Cincinnati, Ohio, U.S.	
37	Win	23–8–6	Josh Mills	KO	9 (?)	Jun 12, 1904	20 years, 172 days	Saint Louis, Missouri, U.S.	
36	Win	22–8–6	Barbados Joe Walcott	DQ	20 (20)	Apr 29, 1904	20 years, 128 days	Woodward's Pavilion, San Francisco, California, U.S.	World welterweight title at stake; Disregarded as a title fight as the ref had bet on Dixie Kid; Walcott was DQ'd for a kidney punch, despite landing them throughout with no warning of foul
35	Win	21–8–6	John Solomon	KO	11 (20)	Feb 26, 1904	20 years, 65 days	Central A.C., Fresno, California, U.S.	
34	Win	20–8–6	Al Neill	KO	1 (15)	Feb 9, 1904	20 years, 48 days	Sequoia A.C., Oakland, California, U.S.	
33	Win	19–8–6	Mose LaFontise	KO	10 (20)	Aug 10, 1903	19 years, 230 days	Seattle, Washington, U.S.	
32	Win	18–8–6	Al Neill	PTS	20	May 21, 1903	19 years, 149 days	Hazard's Pavilion, Los Angeles, California, U.S.	
31	Win	17–8–6	Charles Dutch Thurston	KO	1 (?)	May 5, 1903	19 years, 133 days	Hazard's Pavilion, Los Angeles, California, U.S.	
30	Win	16–8–6	Eddie Cain	KO	2 (10)	Mar 31, 1903	19 years, 98 days	Mechanic's Pavilion, San Francisco, California, U.S.	
29	Win	15–8–6	Phil Green	KO	5 (10)	Feb 5, 1903	19 years, 44 days	Dietz Opera House, Oakland, California, U.S.	
28	Win	14–8–6	Freddie Mueller	KO	8 (?)	Jan 15, 1903	19 years, 23 days	Mechanic's Pavilion, San Francisco, California, U.S.	
27	Draw	13–8–6	Charles Dutch Thurston	PTS	20	Dec 30, 1902	19 years, 7 days	Stockton Athletic Club, Stockton, California, U.S.	
26	Win	13–8–5	Mike McClure	TKO	3 (8)	Dec 18, 1902	18 years, 360 days	Exposition Building, Oakland, California, U.S.	
25	Win	12–8–5	John Dukelow	KO	6 (?)	Dec 3, 1902	18 years, 345 days	Reliance A.C., Oakland, California, U.S.	
24	Win	11–8–5	Fred Williams	KO	1 (6)	Nov 18, 1902	18 years, 330 days	Reliance A.C., Oakland, California, U.S.	
23	Win	10–8–5	Henry Lewis	KO	11 (15)	Oct 31, 1902	18 years, 312 days	Woodward's Pavilion, San Francisco, California, U.S.	
22	Win	9–8–5	John Dukelow	TKO	1 (6)	Oct 7, 1902	18 years, 288 days	Reliance A.C., Oakland, California, U.S.	
21	Win	8–8–5	Frank McConnell	KO	4 (?)	Sep 30, 1902	18 years, 281 days	West Oakland Club, Oakland, California, U.S.	
20	Loss	7–8–5	Cyclone Kelly	PTS	4	Sep 18, 1902	18 years, 269 days	Reliance A.C., Oakland, California, U.S.	
19	Draw	7–7–5	Kid Williams	PTS	10	Jul 11, 1902	18 years, 200 days	Hazard's Pavilion, Los Angeles, California, U.S.	
18	Win	7–7–4	Mike McClure	TKO	2 (?)	Oct 11, 1901	17 years, 292 days	Stockton, California, U.S.	
17	Win	6–7–4	Tim Leonard	KO	1 (?)	Sep 25, 1901	17 years, 276 days	Avon Theater, Stockton, California, U.S.	
16	Loss	5–7–4	Kid Williams	PTS	10	Aug 22, 1901	17 years, 242 days	Stockton Athletic Club, Stockton, California, U.S.	
15	Loss	5–6–4	Henry Lewis	DQ	20 (20)	Jul 3, 1901	17 years, 192 days	Fresno, California, U.S.	
14	Win	5–5–4	Jack Dean	PTS	10	May 29, 1901	17 years, 157 days	Fresno, California, U.S.	
13	Win	4–5–4	Frank Dougherty	KO	2 (?)	May 4, 1901	17 years, 132 days	Fresno, California, U.S.	
12	Loss	3–5–4	Henry Lewis	KO	4 (?)	Feb 14, 1901	17 years, 53 days	Stockton, California, U.S.	
11	Draw	3–4–4	Kid Williams	PTS	6	Dec 28, 1900	17 years, 5 days	Los Angeles Athletic Club, Los Angeles, California, U.S.	
10	Win	3–4–3	Kid Sharkey	PTS	4	Dec 22, 1900	16 years, 364 days	Los Angeles, California, U.S.	
9	Loss	2–4–3	Kid Williams	PTS	20	Nov 26, 1900	16 years, 338 days	United Republican Club, Los Angeles, California, U.S.	
8	Loss	2–3–3	Kid Williams	PTS	20	Oct 29, 1900	16 years, 310 days	United Republican Club, Los Angeles, California, U.S.	
7	Win	2–2–3	Oakland Kid	PTS	6	Oct 22, 1900	16 years, 303 days	Los Angeles, California, U.S.	
6	Draw	1–2–3	Clyde Burnham	PTS	6	Sep 28, 1900	16 years, 279 days	Manhattan Club, Los Angeles, California, U.S.	
5	Loss	1–2–2	Kid Williams	PTS	20	Jul 20, 1900	16 years, 209 days	Manhattan Club, Los Angeles, California, U.S.	
4	Win	1–1–2	Kid Thompson	PTS	4	Mar 23, 1900	16 years, 90 days	Manhattan Club, Los Angeles, California, U.S.	
3	Loss	0–1–2	Bob Morrissey	TKO	2 (4)	Mar 16, 1900	16 years, 83 days	Manhattan Club, Los Angeles, California, U.S.	
2	Draw	0–0–2	Kid Morrissey	PTS	3	Mar 9, 1900	16 years, 76 days	Manhattan Club, Los Angeles, California, U.S.	
1	Draw	0–0–1	Cuter Kid	PTS	3	Mar 2, 1900	16 years, 69 days	Manhattan Club, Los Angeles, California, U.S.	

=== Unofficial record ===
164 fights	92 wins	45 losses
By knockout	59	6
By decision	30	36
By disqualification	3	3
Draws	21	
No contests	6	

Record with the inclusion of newspaper decisions to the win/loss/draw column.

No.	Result	Record	Opponent	Type	Round	Date	Age	Location	Notes
164	Loss	92–45–21 (6)	Paul Buisson	PTS	12	Mar 14, 1920	36 years, 82 days	Casino de la Plage, Marseille, Bouches-du-Rhône, France	
163	Loss	92–44–21 (6)	Constant Pluyette	PTS	10	Jan 31, 1920	36 years, 39 days	Cirque de Paris, Paris, Paris, France	
162	Win	92–43–21 (6)	Rautal	KO	2 (?)	Oct 24, 1919	35 years, 305 days	Teatro del Bosque, Barcelona, Cataluña, Spain	
161	Win	91–43–21 (6)	Frank Hoche	PTS	20	Jul 24, 1919	35 years, 213 days	Frontón Principal Palace, Barcelona, Cataluña, Spain	
160	Draw	90–43–21 (6)	Frank Hoche	PTS	15	Apr 23, 1919	35 years, 121 days	Iris Park, Barcelona, Cataluña, Spain	
159	Draw	90–43–20 (6)	Frank Hoche	PTS	15	Mar 7, 1918	34 years, 74 days	Iris Park, Barcelona, Cataluña, Spain	
158	Win	90–43–19 (6)	Tom Stokes	PTS	10	Jan 10, 1916	32 years, 18 days	London, England, U.K.	
157	Loss	89–43–19 (6)	Corporal Billy Fullerton	PTS	15	Dec 28, 1915	32 years, 5 days	The Ring, Blackfriars Road, Southwark, London, England, U.K.	
156	Loss	89–42–19 (6)	Dai Roberts	PTS	15	Nov 29, 1915	31 years, 341 days	The Ring, Blackfriars Road, Southwark, London, England, U.K.	
155	Win	89–41–19 (6)	Billy Williams	KO	7 (20)	Oct 25, 1915	31 years, 306 days	The Ring, Blackfriars Road, Southwark, London, England, U.K.	
154	Win	88–41–19 (6)	Liscombe Morland	TKO	12 (?)	Oct 4, 1915	31 years, 285 days	London, England, U.K.	
153	Win	87–41–19 (6)	Jack Morris	TKO	5 (10)	Jun 15, 1915	31 years, 174 days	The Ring, Blackfriars Road, Southwark, London, England, U.K.	
152	Win	86–41–19 (6)	Louis Verger	PTS	20	Jun 7, 1915	31 years, 166 days	London, England, U.K.	
151	Win	85–41–19 (6)	Tom Tees	TKO	15 (20)	May 17, 1915	31 years, 145 days	The Ring, Blackfriars Road, Southwark, London, England, U.K.	
150	Loss	84–41–19 (6)	Patsy Cokeley	PTS	20	Apr 3, 1915	31 years, 101 days	The Ring, Blackfriars Road, Southwark, London, England, U.K.	
149	Loss	84–40–19 (6)	Billy Williams	PTS	20	Mar 15, 1915	31 years, 82 days	London, England, U.K.	
148	Loss	84–39–19 (6)	Hippolyte Tyncke	PTS	20	Feb 15, 1915	31 years, 54 days	The Ring, Blackfriars Road, Southwark, London, England, U.K.	
147	Win	84–38–19 (6)	Johnny Horan	TKO	8 (?)	Jan 30, 1915	31 years, 38 days	London, England, U.K.	
146	Draw	83–38–19 (6)	Hippolyte Tyncke	PTS	20	Jan 25, 1915	31 years, 33 days	The Ring, Blackfriars Road, Southwark, London, England, U.K.	
145	Draw	83–38–18 (6)	Nicol Simpson	PTS	20	Jan 1, 1915	31 years, 9 days	London, England, U.K.	
144	Loss	83–38–17 (6)	Nicol Simpson	PTS	20	Dec 7, 1914	30 years, 349 days	The Ring, Blackfriars Road, Southwark, London, England, U.K.	
143	Win	83–37–17 (6)	Bill Bristowe	KO	2 (15)	Apr 6, 1914	30 years, 104 days	The Ring, Blackfriars Road, Southwark, London, England, U.K.	
142	Loss	82–37–17 (6)	Alf Wye	PTS	10	Apr 2, 1914	30 years, 100 days	Canterbury Music Hall, Lambeth, London, England, U.K.	
141	Win	82–36–17 (6)	Bill Bristowe	KO	2 (20)	Mar 30, 1914	30 years, 97 days	The Ring, Blackfriars Road, Southwark, London, England, U.K.	
140	Loss	81–36–17 (6)	Dick Nelson	PTS	20	Mar 28, 1914	30 years, 95 days	The Ring, Blackfriars Road, Southwark, London, England, U.K.	
139	Loss	81–35–17 (6)	Bill Bristowe	PTS	20	Mar 16, 1914	30 years, 83 days	The Ring, Blackfriars Road, Southwark, London, England, U.K.	
138	Win	81–34–17 (6)	Jim Rideout	TKO	8 (10)	Mar 9, 1914	30 years, 76 days	Acton Baths, Acton, London, England, U.K.	
137	Win	80–34–17 (6)	Fred Drummond	TKO	5 (?)	Mar 3, 1914	30 years, 70 days	London Palladium, West End, London, England, U.K.	
136	Draw	79–34–17 (6)	Tom Stokes	PTS	10	Feb 28, 1914	30 years, 67 days	The Ring, Blackfriars Road, Southwark, London, England, U.K.	
135	Win	79–34–16 (6)	Fireman George Anderson	KO	2 (20)	Jan 12, 1914	30 years, 20 days	Drill Hall, Birkenhead, Merseyside, England, U.K.	
134	Loss	78–34–16 (6)	Bandsman Jack Blake	PTS	20	Jan 1, 1914	30 years, 9 days	The Ring, Blackfriars Road, Southwark, London, England, U.K.	
133	Win	78–33–16 (6)	Fireman George Anderson	PTS	10	Dec 20, 1913	29 years, 362 days	The Ring, Blackfriars Road, Southwark, London, England, U.K.	
132	Win	77–33–16 (6)	Dick Nelson	PTS	20	Dec 8, 1913	29 years, 350 days	National Sporting Club, Covent Garden, London, England, U.K.	
131	Loss	76–33–16 (6)	Henri Demlen	PTS	15	Nov 28, 1913	29 years, 340 days	Élysée Montmartre, Paris, Paris, France	
130	Win	76–32–16 (6)	Dick Nelson	TKO	13 (20)	Nov 13, 1913	29 years, 325 days	National Sporting Club, Covent Garden, London, England, U.K.	
129	Win	75–32–16 (6)	Albert Scanlon	PTS	20	Oct 27, 1913	29 years, 308 days	National Sporting Club, Covent Garden, London, England, U.K.	
128	Win	74–32–16 (6)	Jack Goldswain	KO	4 (?)	Oct 13, 1913	29 years, 294 days	London, England, U.K.	
127	Loss	73–32–16 (6)	Private Jim Harris	PTS	10	Sep 22, 1913	29 years, 273 days	London, England, U.K.	
126	NC	73–31–16 (6)	Johnny Mathieson	NC	9 (20)	May 5, 1913	29 years, 133 days	St James Hall, Newcastle, Tyne and Wear, England, U.K.	The referee declared a no contest as both boxers were not doing their best
125	Loss	73–31–16 (5)	Jerry Thompson	RTD	1 (20)	Apr 10, 1913	29 years, 108 days	Liverpool Stadium, Pudsey Street, Liverpool, Merseyside, England, U.K.	Dixie twisted his ankle and retired
124	Loss	73–30–16 (5)	Johnny Mathieson	DQ	12 (20)	Mar 26, 1913	29 years, 93 days	Boulevard Rink, Leicester, Leicestershire, England, U.K.	
123	Win	73–29–16 (5)	Louis Verger	PTS	20	Mar 17, 1913	29 years, 84 days	The Ring, Blackfriars Road, Southwark, London, England, U.K.	
122	Win	72–29–16 (5)	Seaman Hulls	KO	4 (?)	Feb 28, 1913	29 years, 67 days	Cosmopolitan Gymnasium, Plymouth, Devon, England, U.K.	
121	Win	71–29–16 (5)	Jack Morris	KO	4 (20)	Feb 13, 1913	29 years, 52 days	Liverpool Stadium, Liverpool, Merseyside, England, U.K.	
120	Loss	70–29–16 (5)	Johnny Mathieson	PTS	20	Jan 13, 1913	29 years, 21 days	Stadium, Sparbrook, West Midlands, England, U.K.	
119	Win	70–28–16 (5)	Arthur Evernden	KO	9 (20)	Jan 2, 1913	29 years, 10 days	Liverpool Stadium, Pudsey Street, Liverpool, Merseyside, England, U.K.	
118	Win	69–28–16 (5)	Arthur Harman	TKO	9 (15)	Jan 1, 1913	29 years, 9 days	The Ring, Blackfriars Road, Southwark, London, England, U.K.	
117	Win	68–28–16 (5)	Jack Meekins	PTS	15	Dec 26, 1912	29 years, 3 days	The Ring, Blackfriars Road, Southwark, London, England, U.K.	
116	Win	67–28–16 (5)	Bob Reston	KO	3 (?)	Dec 7, 1912	28 years, 350 days	London, England, U.K.	
115	Draw	66–28–16 (5)	Johnny Mathieson	PTS	20	Nov 18, 1912	28 years, 331 days	The Ring, Blackfriars Road, Southwark, London, England, U.K.	
114	Draw	66–28–15 (5)	Jack Meekins	PTS	10	Nov 4, 1912	28 years, 317 days	The Ring, Blackfriars Road, Southwark, London, England, U.K.	
113	Loss	66–28–14 (5)	Johnny Mathieson	PTS	20	Oct 14, 1912	28 years, 296 days	The Ring, Blackfriars Road, Southwark, London, England, U.K.	
112	Loss	66–27–14 (5)	Marcel Thomas	PTS	15	Oct 4, 1912	28 years, 286 days	Élysée Montmartre, Paris, Paris, France	Lost world welterweight title "claim"
111	NC	66–26–14 (5)	Charlie Knock	NC	2 (20)	Aug 8, 1912	28 years, 229 days	Vickers' Sports Grounds, Carbrook, Yorkshire, England, U.K.	
110	Loss	66–26–14 (4)	Jack Morris	PTS	10	Jun 1, 1912	28 years, 161 days	Premierland, Whitechapel, London, England, U.K.	
109	Win	66–25–14 (4)	Wag Marshall	KO	3 (15)	May 25, 1912	28 years, 154 days	Pheasant Inn Grounds, Carbrook, Yorkshire, England, U.K.	
108	Loss	65–25–14 (4)	Dan Flynn	PTS	10	May 6, 1912	28 years, 135 days	Scottish National AC, Glasgow, Scotland, U.K.	
107	Win	65–24–14 (4)	George Gunther	DQ	15 (?)	May 2, 1912	28 years, 131 days	Liverpool Stadium, Pudsey Street, Liverpool, Merseyside, England, U.K.	
106	Win	64–24–14 (4)	Georges Bernard	TKO	11 (20)	Apr 24, 1912	28 years, 123 days	Cirque de Paris, Paris, Paris, France	Retained world welterweight title "claim"
105	Win	63–24–14 (4)	Harry Duncan	PTS	20	Apr 8, 1912	28 years, 107 days	The Ring, Blackfriars Road, Southwark, London, England, U.K.	
104	Win	62–24–14 (4)	Ted Lee	KO	4 (20)	Mar 18, 1912	28 years, 86 days	The Ring, Blackfriars Road, Southwark, London, England, U.K.	
103	Win	61–24–14 (4)	Young Johnny Johnson	RTD	3 (15)	Mar 9, 1912	28 years, 77 days	Drill Hall, Merthyr Tydfil, Wales, U.K.	
102	Win	60–24–14 (4)	Gunner James Durn	KO	6 (10)	Feb 17, 1912	28 years, 57 days	The Ring, Blackfriars Road, Southwark, London, England, U.K.	
101	Loss	59–24–14 (4)	Harry Lewis	TKO	8 (20)	Jan 18, 1912	28 years, 26 days	Liverpool Stadium, Pudsey Street, Liverpool, Merseyside, England, U.K.	
100	Win	59–23–14 (4)	Johnny Summers	KO	2 (20)	Nov 9, 1911	27 years, 321 days	Liverpool Stadium, Pudsey Street, Liverpool, Merseyside, England, U.K.	Retained world welterweight title "claim"
99	Win	58–23–14 (4)	Seaman Brown	KO	6 (?)	Sep 22, 1911	27 years, 273 days	Plymouth, Devon, England, U.K.	
98	Win	57–23–14 (4)	Georges Carpentier	TKO	5 (15)	Aug 19, 1911	27 years, 239 days	Trouville, Calvados, France	
97	NC	56–23–14 (4)	Harry Duncan	NC	6 (20)	Jul 10, 1911	27 years, 199 days	Rotunda Rink, Dublin, Ireland	Billed for world welterweight title "claim"
96	Loss	56–23–14 (3)	Blink McCloskey	DQ	3 (15)	Jul 3, 1911	27 years, 192 days	Wonderland, Whitechapel Road, Mile End, London, England, U.K.	
95	Win	56–22–14 (3)	Fred Stuber	KO	3 (?)	Jun 14, 1911	27 years, 173 days	Reims, Marne, France	
94	Win	55–22–14 (3)	Young Loughrey	DQ	10 (15)	May 20, 1911	27 years, 148 days	Cirque de Paris, Paris, Paris, France	Low blow
93	Loss	54–22–14 (3)	Willie Lewis	PTS	20	Apr 29, 1911	27 years, 127 days	Cirque de Paris, Paris, Paris, France	
92	ND	54–21–14 (3)	Kid Wilson	ND	10	Feb 13, 1911	27 years, 52 days	Harrison, New York, U.S.	
91	Loss	54–21–14 (2)	Bob Moha	NWS	10	Feb 10, 1911	27 years, 49 days	Miller's Hall, Buffalo, New York, U.S.	
90	Loss	54–20–14 (2)	Mike "Twin" Sullivan	NWS	10	Jan 17, 1911	27 years, 25 days	Harmonia Hall, Buffalo, New York, U.S.	
89	NC	54–19–14 (2)	Frank Mantell	NC	4 (12)	Nov 24, 1910	26 years, 336 days	Waterbury, Connecticut, U.S.	
88	Loss	54–19–14 (1)	Willie Lewis	NWS	10	Nov 17, 1910	26 years, 329 days	National S.C., New York City, New York, U.S.	
87	Win	54–18–14 (1)	Dennis Tighe	NWS	10	Oct 26, 1910	26 years, 307 days	Sharkey A.C., New York City, New York, U.S.	
86	Draw	53–18–14 (1)	Dick Nelson	NWS	10	Sep 19, 1910	26 years, 270 days	Olympia Boxing Club, New York City, New York, U.S.	
85	Win	53–18–13 (1)	Willie Lewis	NWS	10	Sep 9, 1910	26 years, 260 days	National S.C., New York City, New York, U.S.	
84	Draw	52–18–13 (1)	Joe Uvanni	NWS	10	Sep 5, 1910	26 years, 256 days	Casino A.C., Glens Falls, New York, U.S.	
83	Loss	52–18–12 (1)	Fighting Kennedy	NWS	10	Aug 19, 1910	26 years, 239 days	Lehigh A.C., New York City, New York, U.S.	
82	Win	52–17–12 (1)	Frank Mantell	NWS	10	Aug 1, 1910	26 years, 221 days	Olympia Boxing Club, New York City, New York, U.S.	
81	Win	51–17–12 (1)	George Cole	KO	4 (10)	Jul 20, 1910	26 years, 209 days	Sharkey A.C., New York City, New York, U.S.	
80	Win	50–17–12 (1)	Fighting Kennedy	TKO	8 (10)	Jul 11, 1910	26 years, 200 days	Olympia Boxing Club, New York City, New York, U.S.	
79	NC	49–17–12 (1)	Bill Hurley	NC	8 (10)	May 23, 1910	26 years, 151 days	Casino A.C., Glens Falls, New York, U.S.	
78	Win	49–17–12	Billy West	KO	4 (?)	May 19, 1910	26 years, 147 days	Sharkey A.C., New York City, New York, U.S.	
77	Loss	48–17–12	Jimmy Clabby	NWS	10	May 5, 1910	26 years, 133 days	Empire A.C., New York City, New York, U.S.	
76	Win	48–16–12	Joe Gaynor	KO	3 (?)	Apr 27, 1910	26 years, 125 days	Sharkey A.C., New York City, New York, U.S.	
75	Win	47–16–12	Jack Fitzgerald	NWS	10	Apr 20, 1910	26 years, 118 days	Sharkey A.C., New York City, New York, U.S.	
74	Win	46–16–12	Bill Hurley	NWS	10	Apr 5, 1910	26 years, 103 days	Casino A.C., Glens Falls, New York, U.S.	
73	Draw	45–16–12	Kid Henry	NWS	10	Mar 21, 1910	26 years, 88 days	Beaver A.C., Troy, New York, U.S.	
72	Loss	45–16–11	Kyle Whitney	PTS	8	Mar 15, 1910	26 years, 82 days	Armory, Boston, Massachusetts, U.S.	
71	Win	45–15–11	Bill Hurley	TKO	4 (10)	Mar 14, 1910	26 years, 81 days	Troy, New York, U.S.	
70	Win	44–15–11	Jack Fitzgerald	NWS	10	Mar 2, 1910	26 years, 69 days	Sharkey A.C., New York City, New York, U.S.	
69	Win	43–15–11	Jack Farrell	KO	9 (10)	Jan 26, 1910	26 years, 34 days	Sharkey A.C., New York City, New York, U.S.	
68	Loss	42–15–11	Sam Langford	KO	3 (8)	Jan 10, 1910	26 years, 18 days	Phoenix A.C., Memphis, Tennessee, U.S.	For world colored heavyweight title claim
67	Win	42–14–11	Christy Williams	KO	3 (?)	Dec 27, 1909	26 years, 4 days	Memphis, Tennessee, U.S.	
66	Win	41–14–11	Bert Whirlwind	KO	3 (8)	Nov 29, 1909	25 years, 341 days	Memphis, Tennessee, U.S.	
65	Win	40–14–11	Jeff Clark	PTS	8	Nov 15, 1909	25 years, 327 days	Memphis, Tennessee, U.S.	
64	Win	39–14–11	Jeff Clark	PTS	8	Nov 1, 1909	25 years, 313 days	Memphis, Tennessee, U.S.	
63	Win	38–14–11	Jack Gray	PTS	8	Oct 18, 1909	25 years, 299 days	Memphis, Tennessee, U.S.	
62	Win	37–14–11	Eugene Sims	KO	3 (?)	Oct 11, 1909	25 years, 292 days	Memphis, Tennessee, U.S.	
61	Loss	36–14–11	Sam Langford	RTD	5 (12)	Sep 28, 1909	25 years, 279 days	Armory, Boston, Massachusetts, U.S.	For world colored heavyweight title claim
60	Win	36–13–11	Battling Jack Johnson	KO	2 (?)	Sep 11, 1909	25 years, 262 days	New York City, New York, U.S.	
59	Win	35–13–11	Young Sam Langford	TKO	1 (?)	Sep 8, 1909	25 years, 259 days	Sharkey A.C., New York City, New York, U.S.	
58	Win	34–13–11	Mickey McDonough	NWS	10	Sep 1, 1909	25 years, 252 days	Sharkey A.C., New York City, New York, U.S.	
57	Win	33–13–11	Kid Williams	KO	4 (?)	Aug 25, 1909	25 years, 245 days	New York City, New York, U.S.	
56	Win	32–13–11	Sailor Cunningham	KO	5 (10)	Aug 18, 1909	25 years, 238 days	Sharkey A.C., New York City, New York, U.S.	
55	Win	31–13–11	Young Tommy Coleman	NWS	6	Oct 27, 1908	24 years, 309 days	Douglas A.C., Philadelphia, Pennsylvania, U.S.	
54	Loss	30–13–11	George Cole	NWS	6	Oct 17, 1908	24 years, 299 days	National A.C., Philadelphia, Pennsylvania, U.S.	
53	Win	30–12–11	Fighting Ghost	KO	2 (?)	Oct 8, 1908	24 years, 290 days	Highland Park, York, Pennsylvania, U.S.	
52	Win	29–12–11	Cub White	NWS	6	Sep 28, 1908	24 years, 280 days	West End A.C., Philadelphia, Pennsylvania, U.S.	
51	Win	28–12–11	Jeff Clark	NWS	6	Sep 24, 1908	24 years, 276 days	Broadway A.C., Philadelphia, Pennsylvania, U.S.	
50	Draw	27–12–11	Cub White	NWS	6	Sep 10, 1908	24 years, 262 days	Broadway A.C., Philadelphia, Pennsylvania, U.S.	
49	Loss	27–12–10	Ed Givens	NWS	6	Mar 6, 1906	22 years, 73 days	Business Men's Club, Pittsburgh, Pennsylvania, U.S.	
48	Draw	27–11–10	Joe Grim	NWS	6	Feb 17, 1905	21 years, 56 days	Maennerchor Hall, Lancaster, Pennsylvania, U.S.	
47	Loss	27–11–9	George Cole	NWS	6	Jan 7, 1905	21 years, 15 days	National A.C., Philadelphia, Pennsylvania, U.S.	
46	Draw	27–10–9	Larry Temple	PTS	15	Jan 2, 1905	21 years, 10 days	Germania Maennerchor Hall, Baltimore, Maryland, U.S.	
45	Draw	27–10–8	Young Peter Jackson	PTS	15	Dec 26, 1904	21 years, 3 days	Germania Maennerchor Hall, Baltimore, Maryland, U.S.	
44	Win	27–10–7	Dave Holly	NWS	6	Nov 25, 1904	20 years, 338 days	Manhattan A.C., Philadelphia, Pennsylvania, U.S.	
43	Loss	26–10–7	Philadelphia Jack O'Brien	NWS	6	Nov 12, 1904	20 years, 325 days	National A.C., Philadelphia, Pennsylvania, U.S.	
42	Draw	26–9–7	Larry Temple	NWS	6	Nov 5, 1904	20 years, 318 days	National A.C., Philadelphia, Pennsylvania, U.S.	
41	Loss	26–9–6	Dave Holly	NWS	6	Oct 15, 1904	20 years, 297 days	National A.C., Philadelphia, Pennsylvania, U.S.	
40	Win	26–8–6	Joe Grim	PTS	6	Oct 3, 1904	20 years, 285 days	Mount Clemens, Michigan, U.S.	
39	Win	25–8–6	Joe Grim	PTS	10	Sep 21, 1904	20 years, 273 days	Saginaw, Michigan, U.S.	
38	Win	24–8–6	John Dancer	KO	4 (?)	Jul 1, 1904	20 years, 191 days	Cincinnati, Ohio, U.S.	
37	Win	23–8–6	Josh Mills	KO	9 (?)	Jun 12, 1904	20 years, 172 days	Saint Louis, Missouri, U.S.	
36	Win	22–8–6	Barbados Joe Walcott	DQ	20 (20)	Apr 29, 1904	20 years, 128 days	Woodward's Pavilion, San Francisco, California, U.S.	World welterweight title at stake; Disregarded as a title fight as the ref had bet on Dixie Kid; Walcott was DQ'd for a kidney punch, despite landing them throughout with no warning of foul
35	Win	21–8–6	John Solomon	KO	11 (20)	Feb 26, 1904	20 years, 65 days	Central A.C., Fresno, California, U.S.	
34	Win	20–8–6	Al Neill	KO	1 (15)	Feb 9, 1904	20 years, 48 days	Sequoia A.C., Oakland, California, U.S.	
33	Win	19–8–6	Mose LaFontise	KO	10 (20)	Aug 10, 1903	19 years, 230 days	Seattle, Washington, U.S.	
32	Win	18–8–6	Al Neill	PTS	20	May 21, 1903	19 years, 149 days	Hazard's Pavilion, Los Angeles, California, U.S.	
31	Win	17–8–6	Charles Dutch Thurston	KO	1 (?)	May 5, 1903	19 years, 133 days	Hazard's Pavilion, Los Angeles, California, U.S.	
30	Win	16–8–6	Eddie Cain	KO	2 (10)	Mar 31, 1903	19 years, 98 days	Mechanic's Pavilion, San Francisco, California, U.S.	
29	Win	15–8–6	Phil Green	KO	5 (10)	Feb 5, 1903	19 years, 44 days	Dietz Opera House, Oakland, California, U.S.	
28	Win	14–8–6	Freddie Mueller	KO	8 (?)	Jan 15, 1903	19 years, 23 days	Mechanic's Pavilion, San Francisco, California, U.S.	
27	Draw	13–8–6	Charles Dutch Thurston	PTS	20	Dec 30, 1902	19 years, 7 days	Stockton Athletic Club, Stockton, California, U.S.	
26	Win	13–8–5	Mike McClure	TKO	3 (8)	Dec 18, 1902	18 years, 360 days	Exposition Building, Oakland, California, U.S.	
25	Win	12–8–5	John Dukelow	KO	6 (?)	Dec 3, 1902	18 years, 345 days	Reliance A.C., Oakland, California, U.S.	
24	Win	11–8–5	Fred Williams	KO	1 (6)	Nov 18, 1902	18 years, 330 days	Reliance A.C., Oakland, California, U.S.	
23	Win	10–8–5	Henry Lewis	KO	11 (15)	Oct 31, 1902	18 years, 312 days	Woodward's Pavilion, San Francisco, California, U.S.	
22	Win	9–8–5	John Dukelow	TKO	1 (6)	Oct 7, 1902	18 years, 288 days	Reliance A.C., Oakland, California, U.S.	
21	Win	8–8–5	Frank McConnell	KO	4 (?)	Sep 30, 1902	18 years, 281 days	West Oakland Club, Oakland, California, U.S.	
20	Loss	7–8–5	Cyclone Kelly	PTS	4	Sep 18, 1902	18 years, 269 days	Reliance A.C., Oakland, California, U.S.	
19	Draw	7–7–5	Kid Williams	PTS	10	Jul 11, 1902	18 years, 200 days	Hazard's Pavilion, Los Angeles, California, U.S.	
18	Win	7–7–4	Mike McClure	TKO	2 (?)	Oct 11, 1901	17 years, 292 days	Stockton, California, U.S.	
17	Win	6–7–4	Tim Leonard	KO	1 (?)	Sep 25, 1901	17 years, 276 days	Avon Theater, Stockton, California, U.S.	
16	Loss	5–7–4	Kid Williams	PTS	10	Aug 22, 1901	17 years, 242 days	Stockton Athletic Club, Stockton, California, U.S.	
15	Loss	5–6–4	Henry Lewis	DQ	20 (20)	Jul 3, 1901	17 years, 192 days	Fresno, California, U.S.	
14	Win	5–5–4	Jack Dean	PTS	10	May 29, 1901	17 years, 157 days	Fresno, California, U.S.	
13	Win	4–5–4	Frank Dougherty	KO	2 (?)	May 4, 1901	17 years, 132 days	Fresno, California, U.S.	
12	Loss	3–5–4	Henry Lewis	KO	4 (?)	Feb 14, 1901	17 years, 53 days	Stockton, California, U.S.	
11	Draw	3–4–4	Kid Williams	PTS	6	Dec 28, 1900	17 years, 5 days	Los Angeles Athletic Club, Los Angeles, California, U.S.	
10	Win	3–4–3	Kid Sharkey	PTS	4	Dec 22, 1900	16 years, 364 days	Los Angeles, California, U.S.	
9	Loss	2–4–3	Kid Williams	PTS	20	Nov 26, 1900	16 years, 338 days	United Republican Club, Los Angeles, California, U.S.	
8	Loss	2–3–3	Kid Williams	PTS	20	Oct 29, 1900	16 years, 310 days	United Republican Club, Los Angeles, California, U.S.	
7	Win	2–2–3	Oakland Kid	PTS	6	Oct 22, 1900	16 years, 303 days	Los Angeles, California, U.S.	
6	Draw	1–2–3	Clyde Burnham	PTS	6	Sep 28, 1900	16 years, 279 days	Manhattan Club, Los Angeles, California, U.S.	
5	Loss	1–2–2	Kid Williams	PTS	20	Jul 20, 1900	16 years, 209 days	Manhattan Club, Los Angeles, California, U.S.	
4	Win	1–1–2	Kid Thompson	PTS	4	Mar 23, 1900	16 years, 90 days	Manhattan Club, Los Angeles, California, U.S.	
3	Loss	0–1–2	Bob Morrissey	TKO	2 (4)	Mar 16, 1900	16 years, 83 days	Manhattan Club, Los Angeles, California, U.S.	
2	Draw	0–0–2	Kid Morrissey	PTS	3	Mar 9, 1900	16 years, 76 days	Manhattan Club, Los Angeles, California, U.S.	
1	Draw	0–0–1	Cuter Kid	PTS	3	Mar 2, 1900	16 years, 69 days	Manhattan Club, Los Angeles, California, U.S.	

== See also ==
- Lineal championship
- List of welterweight boxing champions
