= John Somers-Cocks =

John Somers-Cocks may refer to:

- John Somers-Cocks, 1st Earl Somers
- John Somers-Cocks, 2nd Earl Somers

== See also ==
- John Somers (disambiguation)
- John Cocks (disambiguation)
