= Harrison Summers =

Harrison Summers may refer to:

- Harrison Boyd Summers (1894–1980), American pioneer in radio broadcasting, radio historian and educator
- Harrison C. Summers (1918–1983), American U.S. Army soldier and DSC recipient

== See also ==
- Harry Summers (disambiguation)
