= John Somers (disambiguation) =

John Somers, 1st Baron Somers (1651–1716) was an English Whig jurist and statesman.

John Somers may also refer to:

- John Somers (courtier), 16th-century Elizabethan diplomat and deputy keeper of Mary, Queen of Scots
- John Somers (motorcyclist) in 1963 Grand Prix motorcycle racing season
- John Somers (sport shooter) (1874–1942), represented Great Britain at the 1912 Summer Olympics
- John Patrick Somers (1791–1862), Irish politician

== See also ==
- John Somers-Cocks (disambiguation)
- John Sommers, American football
- John Sommers (minister) from Encyclopædia Edinensis
- John Summers (disambiguation)
