= Sumners =

Sumners is a surname. Notable people with the name include:

- De Witt Sumners, American mathematician
- Hatton W. Sumners (1875–1962), American politician
- Rosalynn Sumners (born 1964), American figure skater

== See also ==
- Sumner (surname)
- Summers (surname)
