= Harry Summers (disambiguation) =

Harry G. Summers Jr. was a professional soldier and author.

Harry Summers may also refer to:

== Other people ==
- Harry Summers (runner), Australian distance runner and competitor in the men's 10,000 metres event at the 2014 Commonwealth Games
- Harry Summers (racewalker), Australian racewalker and competitor at the 1985 IAAF World Race Walking Cup

== Fictional characters ==
- Harry Summers, character in Silver Spoons
- Harry Summers, MSquad character played by Ron Hayes
- Harry Summers, character in The Jackpot

== See also ==
- Henry Summers (disambiguation)
- Harrison Summers (disambiguation)
- Harry Somers (1925–1999), composer
