= Henry Summers =

Henry Summers may refer to:

- Hal Summers (Henry Forbes Summers, 1911–2005), British civil servant and poet
- Henry Summers, pseudonym used by actor Ed Wynn
- Henry Summers, fictional character in That Other Woman
- Henry Summers, co-owner of John Summers & Sons
- Henry M. Summers (died 1865), acting mayor of New Orleans in 1858

== See also ==
- Harry Summers (disambiguation)
- Henry Lee Summer (born 1955), American musician
- Hank Summers, character in Buffy the Vampire Slayer
