= Bob Marriott =

English boxer

Personal information
- Nationality: British
- Born: Robert Marriott
- Weight: Lightweight

Boxing career

Boxing record
- Total fights: 8
- Wins: 6
- Losses: 2

Robert Marriott was a British boxer. Twice an amateur champion of England, in his professional career he was British and European lightweight champion between 1919 and 1920.

== Career ==
From Bermondsey, London, Marriott served as Private in the British Army during World War I and was an amateur champion of England at lightweight in 1912 and 1914 (and runner-up to F. Grace in 1913) before turning professional.

He made his professional début on 12 November 1917 against Ben Callicott at the National Sporting Club, taking a 15-round points decision. In February 1919 he beat Ted Moore, with Moore disqualified in the sixth round for holding.

In April 1919 he fought Raymond Vittet for the vacant European lightweight title, winning after Vittet was disqualified in the third round. Two months later he beat Johnny Summers to take the British lightweight title vacated by Freddie Welsh, again via the disqualification of his opponent, Summers adjudged to have been holding.

Marriott was due to defend his British title against Llew Edwards in May 1920 but declined the fight and reportedly returned his Lonsdale Belt to the National Sporting Club.

He defended his European title in May 1920, losing to Georges Papin on points in Paris, the fight having been postponed from January due to a leg injury to Marriott.

In February 1921 Marriott retired from boxing, relinquishing his British title, with business interests meaning that he could no longer commit to his boxing career.

== Known professional fights ==
- 12 November 1917 v. Ben Callicott at the National Sporting Club - W (15) - PTS
- 13 May 1918 v. Ted Leister at the National Sporting Club - L 8 (15)
- 20 January 1919 v. Fred Blakeborough at the National Sporting Club - W 11 (15) - RETD
- 17 February 1919 v. Ted Moore at Hoxton Baths - W 6 (?) - DQ (holding)
- 10 March 1919 v. Joe Starmer at the National Sporting Club - W - PTS
- 10 April 1919 v. Raymond Vittet at Holborn Stadium - W 3 (15) - DQ - won vacant European Lightweight title
- 23 June 1919 v. Johnny Summers at the National Sporting Club - W 10 (20) - DQ (holding) - won vacant British lightweight title
- 17 May 1920 v. Georges Papin in Paris - L (20) - PTS - lost European lightweight title
