= Vera Summers =

Vera Ada Summers OBE (born 1899) was an Australian high school teacher and principal.

== Biography ==
Summers attended Perth College followed by the University of Western Australia, where she completed a bachelor of arts degree. She was a member of the staff of Presbyterian Ladies' College, Perth from January 1920 to December 1961, a period of 42 years. She began her career at the college as a teacher, and in 1931 she took the position of deputy principal, followed by principal in January 1934.

In 1928 she received a scholarship and completed a doctoral degree in French at the University of Paris. In 1962 Summers was appointed an officer of the Order of the British Empire.

Summers published two autobiographical books, The light of other days (1977) and Personalities and places (1978).
