= Andrew Rowan Summers =

American lawyer (1912–1968)

Andrew Rowan Summers (December 15, 1912 – March 1968) was an American folk singer and player of the Appalachian dulcimer. He is credited with a large role in preserving Appalachian music from extinction. Summers was among the earliest musicians to draw attention to the dulcimer to a wider audience outside the Appalachians, with John Jacob Niles being one of the few earlier.

Summers was born in Abingdon, Virginia in 1912, and enrolled in the University of Virginia in 1930. Despite his interest in music, he ended up getting a degree in law, working as an attorney and later teaching at New York University.

== Labels ==
- Columbia Records
- Folkways Records

== Discography ==
- Old World Ballads In America (Columbia, 1940)
- The Unquiet Grave (Folkways, 1951)
- Seeds Of Love (single, Folkways, 1951)
- The Lady Gay (single, Folkways, 1954)
- Andrew Rowan Summers (Folkways, 1957)
- Christmas Carols (Folkways, 1966)
