= Young Joseph =

English boxer (1885–1952)

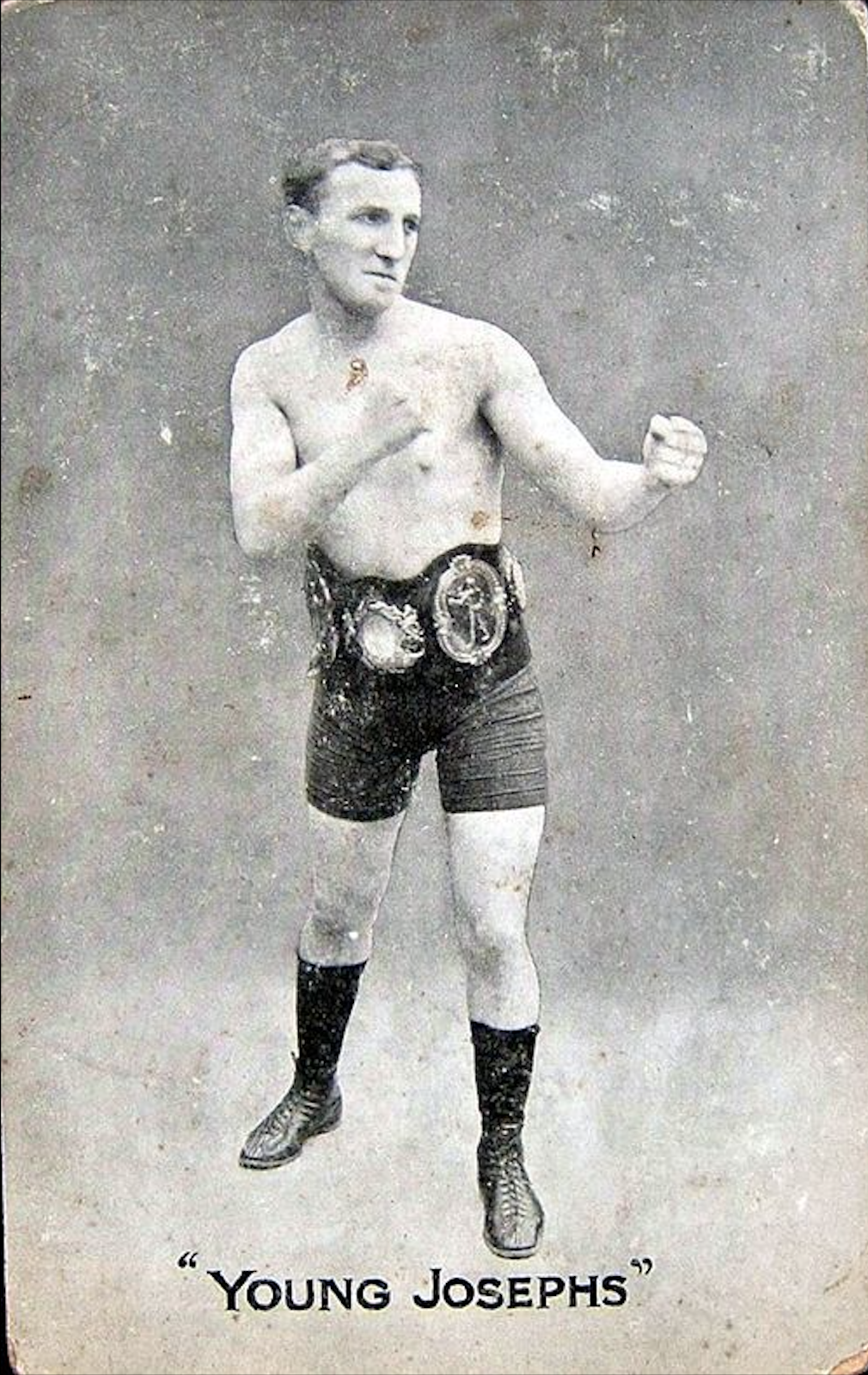
- Joseph

Personal information
- Nationality: British
- Born: Aschel Joseph; 12 February 1885 Aldgate, London, England
- Died: 23 October 1952 (aged 67) Notting Hill Gate, London
- Height: 5 ft 5 in (1.65 m)
- Weight: Welterweight

Boxing career
- Stance: Orthodox

Boxing record
- Total fights: 142
- Wins: 93
- Win by KO: 15
- Losses: 23
- Draws: 21
- No contests: 5

Aschel Joseph (12 February 1885 – 23 October 1952), better known as Young Joseph or Young Josephs, was a British boxer who was British welterweight champion between 1908 and 1912 and European welterweight champion between 1910 and 1911.

== Career ==
Born in Aldgate, London, to Russian Jewish immigrant parents, Joseph attended the Jews' Free School and took up boxing in the Jewish Lads' Brigade. His professional career began in 1903.

After winning most of his early fights, he fought Dick Lee in March 1905 for the 128 lbs championship, winning on points over 10 rounds. He claimed the English lightweight title two months later after a draw with Alf Reed. With titles coming under the jurisdiction of the National Sporting Club, Joseph won his first regulated title in October 1908, beating Corporal Bill Baker to take the English welterweight title (later known as the British welterweight title). He took a 20-round points decision over Young Otto in April 1909, claiming the 142 lbs world title. He successfully defended his British title against Jack Goldswain in March 1910. In June 1910 he fought Harry Lewis in Whitechapel in a fight that was billed as a world welterweight title fight; Lewis stopped Joseph in the 7th round.

In November 1910 he beat "Battling" La Croix in Paris in a fight that was subsequently recognized as a European welterweight title fight. He lost the title in October the following year after losing to Georges Carpentier after being knocked out in the 10th round. He also lost to Arthur Evernden in a non-title fight in January 1911 after being disqualified in the third round for holding. He was due to defend his British title against Johnny Summers in March 1911 but the fight was cancelled after Summers sprained his ankle.

He lost to Billy Hughes in March 1912 and to Summers the following month. After failing to agree terms to defend his British title against Evernden, the NSC considering that his recent losses had devalued him, he resigned his British title and Lonsdale belt on 6 May 1912. He lost to Albert Badoud in Paris in February 1914, and lost his final three fights in Britain, the last in November 1914.

Joseph died on 23 October 1952 at Notting Hill Gate, aged 67.

== See also ==
- List of British welterweight boxing champions
- List of European Boxing Union welterweight champions
