= Jack Goldswain =

British boxer who won the English & Imperial ten stone title

Personal information
- Nationality: British
- Born: 22 July 1878 Bermondsey, London
- Died: 5 November 1954 (aged 76)
- Height: 5 ft 7 in (1.70 m)
- Weight: Lightweight, welterweight

Boxing career

Boxing record
- Total fights: 134
- Wins: 82
- Win by KO: 34
- Losses: 40
- Draws: 12

Jack Goldswain (22 July 1878 – 5 November 1954) was a British boxer who won the English & Imperial ten stone title in 1906 and fought for the British welterweight title in 1910.

== Career ==
Born in Bermondsey, London, Goldswain began his professional boxing career in the mid-1890s. He fought for several English titles in the era before they were standardized and controlled by the National Sporting Club at weights between 130 and 148lbs. In January 1906 he beat Fred Buckland to take the English & Imperial ten stone title, and in April 1906 he successfully defended his title against Jabez White. Fights in this period included wins over Curly Watson, as well as two defeats at the hands of Young Joseph, one of which was recorded in one of the early boxing films.

In October 1909, he beat French middleweight champion Marcel Moreau on points.

In March 1910 Joseph made the first defence of the British welterweight title against Goldswain; Goldswain was disqualified in the eleventh round for holding and "not trying", the NSC refusing to pay him for the fight as a result. He took the National Sporting Club to court in an appeal against the result, but was unsuccessful. In June he was knocked out in the third round by Packey McFarland. In October 1910 he fought Joseph again, this time the two drawing over ten rounds.

In June 1911 he fought Georges Carpentier in Paris, losing via a fourth-round knockout. In December 1911, in a fight with Stoker Green, Goldswain broke his left arm in the fourth round but continued punching with his right and knocked Green out to win the fight.

In December 1912 he met Gus Platts in what was Platts' third professional fight; Goldswain retired at the end of the fourth round due to a leg injury. Goldswain met Young Joseph again in May 1913 and while Goldswain stopped Joseph, the result was declared void due to Goldswain continuing to punch after the bell at the end of the fifth round as he didn't hear the bell; The fight would have continued but Joseph was unable to start the sixth round. Five months later he was beaten by the Dixie Kid in four rounds.

Goldswain served in the Territorial Army during World War I in the 1st Surrey Rifles and later in the cycle section of the Middlesex Hussars, reaching the rank of Sergeant.

Goldswain continued to fight until 1919, his career including over 130 fights.
