= Hal Summers =

British civil servant

Henry Forbes Summers (18 August 1911 in Harrogate, Yorkshire – 22 December 2005 in Basingstoke, Hampshire), aka Hal Summers, was a senior British civil servant. He published several volumes of poetry.

Summers was educated at Fettes College, Edinburgh and Trinity College, Oxford. He joined the Ministry of Health in 1935. He was Private Secretary to Aneurin Bevan while he was Minister of Health, during the passage of the National Health Bill, 1945.

He moved to the Ministry of Housing and Local Government on its creation and was promoted to Under-Secretary in 1955. This ministry was later absorbed into the Department of the Environment. He was made a CB in 1961 and retired in 1971.

== Publications ==
- Smoke After Flame, 1944
- Hinterland, 1947
- Poems in Pamphlet IV: Visions of Time, 1952
- Tomorrow is my Love, 1978
- The Burning Book, 1982
- Brevities, 1991

His most popular poems include "My Old Cat" (voted one of Britain's favourite 20th-century poems in a BBC poll), "The Beginners" and "The Seed".
