= John "Dick" Summers =

American musician (1887–1976)

John Wesley "Dick" Summers (1887–1976) was an old-time fiddler from Indiana. He learned to play from his family, but a Tom Riley of Kentucky was also an influence. Summers did not originally read music, but did learn to do so in his 70s. By his own admission he was mediocre at reading music. He was one of the only old-time Midwestern fiddlers to have a commercially distributed album in the post-World War II era. As indicated though his style had Southern, and as mentioned Kentucky, influences.
