= John Summers (RAF officer) =

British flying ace

John Kenneth Summers
- Born: 22 December 1894; Shamian Island, Canton, China
- Died: Unknown; Rhodesia
- Military career
- Allegiance: United Kingdom
- Branch: British Army; Royal Air Force
- Service years: 1915–1943
- Rank: Group Captain
- Units: Royal Warwickshire Regiment; No. 3 Squadron RFC; No. 209 Squadron RAF; No. 45 Squadron RAF; No. 70 Squadron RAF; No. 47 Squadron RAF
- Conflicts: World War I • Western Front; World War II
- Awards: Military Cross

Group Captain John Kenneth Summers MC (born 22 December 1894, date of death unknown) was a British First World War flying ace credited with eight aerial victories.

== Early life and background ==
Summers was born on Shamian Island, the British Concession in Canton, China, where his father, J. A. Summers, was an employee of the Imperial Maritime Customs Service. Later he attended the University of Birmingham.

== World War I ==
Summers was commissioned as a temporary second lieutenant on 25 January 1915, and served in the 13th Battalion, Royal Warwickshire Regiment, until transferred to the General List on 30 April to serve in the Royal Flying Corps. As an observer he served in No. 3 Squadron RFC, and later trained as a pilot. Summers was awarded Royal Aero Club Aviators' Certificate No. 2154 on 13 December 1915, after soloing a Maurice Farman biplane at the Military School at Birmingham. On completing his training he was appointed a flying officer on 29 February 1916.

He was promoted to lieutenant on 1 July 1916, and appointed a flight commander with the acting-rank of captain on 8 March 1917. On 9 April 1917 he received a mention in despatches for "distinguished and gallant services and devotion to duty" from Field-Marshal Sir Douglas Haig, the commander-in-chief of the British Armies in France, and on 18 July 1917 was awarded the Military Cross. His citation read:

Temporary Second Lieutenant (Temporary Captain) John Kenneth Summers, General List, and R.F.C.

"For conspicuous gallantry and devotion to duty. He has continuously performed valuable work in co-operating with the artillery. He has on many occasions flown at a very low altitude in order to give information to the infantry, which has proved of the utmost value."

In June 1918, Summers was posted to No. 209 Squadron RAF, to fly the Sopwith Camel single seat fighter. Between 23 June and 11 August he accounted for eight enemy aircraft; four destroyed (one shared), three driven down out of control (two shared), and one shared capture. However, on 12 August 1918 his aircraft was shot down by Lothar von Richthofen of Jasta 11, and Summers was taken prisoner. He was held as a POW until after the armistice, finally being repatriated in December 1918.

=== List of aerial victories ===
Combat record
No.	Date/Time	Aircraft/ Serial No.	Opponent	Result	Location	Notes
1	23 June 1918 @ 0710	Sopwith Camel (D3338)	LVG C	Out of control	Martinpuich	Shared with Lieutenant W. J. Armstrong.
2	1 July 1918 @ 1940	Sopwith Camel (D9607)	Albatros D.V	Out of control	Bray	
3	18 July 1918 @ 1100	Sopwith Camel (C198)	Albatros C	Destroyed	Grivesnes–Le Plessier	Shared with Lieutenant Kenneth Walker.
4	26 July 1918 @ 0720	Sopwith Camel	Fokker D.VII	Out of control	North of Comines	Shared with Lieutenants A. L. Porter & Kenneth Walker.
5	8 August 1918 @ 1915	Sopwith Camel (B7471)	Fokker D.VII	Destroyed in flames	Caix	
6	8 August 1918 @ 1915	Sopwith Camel (B7471)	Fokker D.VII	Destroyed	Caix	
7	10 August 1918 @ 1155	Sopwith Camel (D9637)	Fokker D.VII	Captured	East of Bouchoir	Shared with Lieutenant Kenneth Walker.
8	11 August 1918 @ 0755	Sopwith Camel (D9637)	Fokker D.VII	Destroyed	Péronne	

== Inter-war career ==
Summers remained in the RAF post-war, being awarded a permanent commission with the rank of flight lieutenant on 1 August 1919. He served as an instructor, moving from No. 2 Flying Training School to No. 5 Flying Training School on 18 January 1922, then serving at the Central Flying School between 13 March and 1 July 1922, before returning to No. 5 FTS.

On 14 September 1923 he was posted to No. 45 Squadron, based in Iraq, receiving promotion to squadron leader on 1 July 1925. On 18 January 1927 he was transferred to No. 70 Squadron, Iraq, then to No. 47 Squadron, Egypt, on 14 February 1927, then returning to No. 45 Squadron, now based in Egypt, on 25 April 1927.

He returned to the UK when posted to the Headquarters of the Air Defence of Great Britain at Uxbridge on 23 December 1928. On 1 January 1933 Summers was promoted to wing commander. He published a book Practical Air Navigation Simply Explained in 1935, and served as commander of the School of Air Navigation at RAF Manston up to 1 October 1936. He was promoted to group captain on 1 January 1938, serving on the staff of Bomber Command as head of the navigation section.

== World War II ==
On 1 January 1941 Summers received his second mention in despatches from the Air Officer Commanding-in-Chief, and from July 1941 to December 1942 was commanding officer, No. 24 Combined Air Observation School (24 CAOS), which provided training under the British Commonwealth Air Training Plan to British, Commonwealth, and European aircrew. The school was located at RAF Moffat, near Gwelo in Southern Rhodesia. He retired from the Royal Air Force on 1 March 1943.
