= Johnny Summers (boxer) =

English boxer (1883–1946)

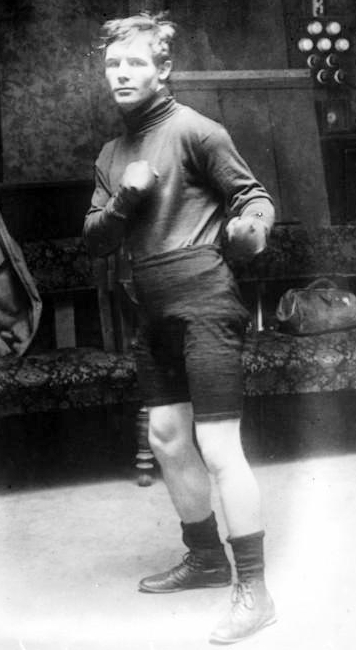

Personal information
- Nationality: British
- Born: Johnny Summers (born Johnny Somers); 21 January 1883 Middlesbrough, England
- Died: 27 March 1946 (aged 64)
- Height: 5 ft 5 in (165 cm)
- Weight: Featherweight; Lightweight; Welterweight

Boxing career
- Stance: Orthodox

Boxing record
- Total fights: 164
- Wins: 96
- Win by KO: 38
- Losses: 31
- Draws: 28
- No contests: 11

Johnny Summers (21 January 1883 – 27 March 1946) was an English boxer who competed from 1901 to 1920. He was a British and British Empire (Commonwealth) welterweight champion.

== Early life ==
Summers was born on 21 January 1883 in Middlesbrough, and raised in Canning Town.

== Boxing career ==
=== Early career ===
Summers made his debut on 1 April 1901 at the Gaiety Athletic Hall, Sydney, Australia, forcing Bob Cooper to retire from the bout in the third round.

On 1 October 1906, Summers fought Boss Edwards for the NSC British featherweight title, winning the twenty round bout on points. He lost the title two months later to Spike Robson on 17 December, Summers being disqualified in the fourth round.

From May 1907 to April 1908, Summers boxed in the United States, beginning with a bout against Harlem Tommy Murphy on 22 May, at the National A.C. in Philadelphia, the bout ending in a draw. Summers ended his tour of the United States with a win over Steve Sullivan on 30 April 1908, at the Eureka A.C. in Baltimore.

On 8 November 1909, Summers fought Freddie Welsh for the NSC British and EBU European lightweight titles. This was also the first-ever contest for the Lonsdale Belt. Summers, bleeding as early as the third round, lost the twenty round bout on points.

=== British welterweight champion ===
On 11 April 1912, Summers fought Young Joseph for the BBBofC British welterweight title, at the Liverpool Stadium, Liverpool. Summers won the twenty round bout on points. He then faced Artur Evernden for the vacant NSC British welterweight title on 17 June 1912, winning the twenty round bout after forcing Evernden to retire in the thirteenth round. Summers defended the NSC title on 9 December 1912 against Sid Burns, winning the bout on points.

In a rematch against Burns on 11 June 1913, Summers again emerged victorious, retaining the BBBofC British welterweight title, and winning the British Empire (Commonwealth) welterweight title. Shortly after he travelled to Australia, where he defended both titles against Artur Evernden at Barker's Pavilion, Melbourne, on 11 June 1913, Summers winning the bout on points.

While still only twenty, New York Jewish boxer Harry Stone defeated Summers on 18 May 1913 in a non-title twenty round points decision at Olympic Stadium in Brisbane, Australia. Though less experienced and six years younger, Stone was considered by most reporters to have outpointed Summers in nearly every round. Years later, Stone wrote Summers "was a fighter with a world-wide reputation, and he had a wallop that would stop any clowning if he landed it, but his speed was not comparable to mine". In September, Stone defeated Summers again in a twenty-round points decision in Sydney.

On 10 January 1914, Summers lost both titles to Tom McCormick by a points decision at the Sydney Stadium, Sydney. He got a rematch against McCormick on 14 February, but failed to win back the titles, being knocked out in the first round.

=== Later career ===
The NSC did not officially recognise the bouts in Australia, and so upon returning home, Summers contested the vacant NSC welterweight title against Johnny Basham on 14 December. Summers, the more experienced fighter, was the favourite going into the bout, but suffered a knockout to the up-and-coming Basham. Summers would get one more title opportunity, against Bob Marriott for the NSC lightweight title on 23 June 1919. Summers was disqualified in the tenth round for holding.

== Notable bouts ==
Result	Opponent	Type	Rd., Time	Date	Location	Notes
Loss	(United Kingdom) Bob Marriott	DQ	10 (20)	1919-06-23	(United Kingdom) National Sporting Club, Covent Garden, London	For vacant NSC British lightweight title.
Loss	(United Kingdom) Johnny Basham	KO	9 (20)	1914-12-14	(United Kingdom) National Sporting Club, Covent Garden, London	For vacant NSC British welterweight title.
Loss	(United Kingdom) Tom McCormick	PTS	20	1914-01-10	(Australia) Sydney Stadium, Sydney, New South Wales	Lost BBBofC British welterweight and British Empire welterweight titles.
Win	(United Kingdom) Artur Evernden	PTS	20	1913-06-11	(Australia) Barker's Pavilion, Melbourne, Victoria	Retained BBBofC British welterweight and British Empire welterweight titles.
Win	(United Kingdom) Sid Burns	PTS	20	1913-06-11	(United Kingdom) National Sporting Club, Covent Garden, London	Retained BBBofC British welterweight title; won British Empire welterweight title.
Win	(United Kingdom) Sid Burns	PTS	20	1912-12-09	(United Kingdom) National Sporting Club, Covent Garden, London	Retained NSC British welterweight title.
Win	(United Kingdom) Artur Evernden	TKO	13 (20)	1912-06-17	(United Kingdom) National Sporting Club, Covent Garden, London	Won vacant NSC British welterweight title.
Win	(United Kingdom) Young Joseph	PTS	20	1912-04-11	(United Kingdom) Liverpool Stadium, Liverpool, Merseyside	Won BBBofC British welterweight title.
Loss	(United Kingdom) Freddie Welsh	PTS	20	1909-11-08	(United Kingdom) National Sporting Club, Covent Garden, London	For European lightweight and NSC British lightweight titles.
Win	(United Kingdom) Jack Goldwain	TKO	14 (20)	1908-11-12	(United Kingdom) National Sporting Club, Covent Garden, London	Won NSC British welterweight title.
Loss	(United Kingdom) Spike Robinson	PTS	20	1906-12-17	(United Kingdom) National Sporting Club, Covent Garden, London	Lost NSC British featherweight title.
Win	(United Kingdom) Boss Edwards	PTS	20	1906-10-01	(United Kingdom) National Sporting Club, Covent Garden, London	Won NSC British featherweight title.
Win	(United Kingdom) Seaman Arthur Hayes	PTS	20	1906-03-19	(United Kingdom) National Sporting Club, Covent Garden, London	Won NSC British super featherweight title.
Win	(United Kingdom) Spike Robson	PTS	20	1906-01-29	(United Kingdom) National Sporting Club, Covent Garden, London	Won vacant NSC British featherweight title.
Win	(Australia) Bob Cooper	TKO	3 (10)	1901-14-01	(Australia) Gaiety Athletic Hall, Sydney, New South Wales	Debut.

== See also ==
- List of British welterweight boxing champions
- List of British featherweight boxing champions

== Bibliography ==
- Harding, John (2016). Lonsdale's Belt: Boxings Most Coveted Prize (1st ed.). Durrington, UK: Pitch Publishing. ISBN 978-1-78531-195-6.

Sporting positions
Regional boxing titles
Preceded by Young Joseph	BBBofC British welterweight champion 11 April 1912 – 10 January 1914	Succeeded by Tom McCormick
New title	British Empire welterweight champion 11 June 1913 – 10 January 1914	Succeeded by Tom McCormick
Vacant Title last held by Artur Evernden	NSC British welterweight champion 17 June 1912 – 10 January 1914; Vacated	Vacant Title next held by Johnny Basham
Preceded by Boss Edwards	NSC British featherweight champion 1 October 1906 – 17 December 1906	Succeeded by Spike Robinson
